

421001–421100 

|-bgcolor=#d6d6d6
| 421001 ||  || — || February 4, 2011 || Haleakala || Pan-STARRS || — || align=right | 2.8 km || 
|-id=002 bgcolor=#d6d6d6
| 421002 ||  || — || June 21, 2007 || Mount Lemmon || Mount Lemmon Survey || — || align=right | 3.4 km || 
|-id=003 bgcolor=#E9E9E9
| 421003 ||  || — || October 27, 2005 || Kitt Peak || Spacewatch || — || align=right | 1.7 km || 
|-id=004 bgcolor=#fefefe
| 421004 ||  || — || September 16, 2010 || Kitt Peak || Spacewatch || (2076) || align=right data-sort-value="0.89" | 890 m || 
|-id=005 bgcolor=#fefefe
| 421005 ||  || — || December 13, 2004 || Kitt Peak || Spacewatch || — || align=right data-sort-value="0.98" | 980 m || 
|-id=006 bgcolor=#E9E9E9
| 421006 ||  || — || February 8, 2007 || Palomar || NEAT || — || align=right | 3.1 km || 
|-id=007 bgcolor=#d6d6d6
| 421007 ||  || — || March 1, 2010 || WISE || WISE || — || align=right | 5.4 km || 
|-id=008 bgcolor=#fefefe
| 421008 ||  || — || February 2, 2005 || Kitt Peak || Spacewatch || — || align=right data-sort-value="0.79" | 790 m || 
|-id=009 bgcolor=#d6d6d6
| 421009 ||  || — || October 5, 2003 || Kitt Peak || Spacewatch || EOS || align=right | 2.2 km || 
|-id=010 bgcolor=#E9E9E9
| 421010 ||  || — || October 24, 2009 || Mount Lemmon || Mount Lemmon Survey || EUN || align=right | 1.4 km || 
|-id=011 bgcolor=#fefefe
| 421011 ||  || — || September 14, 2007 || Mount Lemmon || Mount Lemmon Survey || — || align=right data-sort-value="0.91" | 910 m || 
|-id=012 bgcolor=#d6d6d6
| 421012 ||  || — || February 4, 2005 || Kitt Peak || Spacewatch || — || align=right | 2.0 km || 
|-id=013 bgcolor=#d6d6d6
| 421013 ||  || — || October 2, 2008 || Mount Lemmon || Mount Lemmon Survey || — || align=right | 2.5 km || 
|-id=014 bgcolor=#d6d6d6
| 421014 ||  || — || March 18, 2001 || Kitt Peak || Spacewatch || EOS || align=right | 2.1 km || 
|-id=015 bgcolor=#fefefe
| 421015 ||  || — || October 24, 2003 || Apache Point || SDSS || — || align=right data-sort-value="0.85" | 850 m || 
|-id=016 bgcolor=#fefefe
| 421016 ||  || — || May 4, 2005 || Palomar || NEAT || — || align=right | 1.2 km || 
|-id=017 bgcolor=#d6d6d6
| 421017 ||  || — || September 6, 2008 || Mount Lemmon || Mount Lemmon Survey || — || align=right | 3.2 km || 
|-id=018 bgcolor=#d6d6d6
| 421018 ||  || — || June 20, 2013 || Haleakala || Pan-STARRS || — || align=right | 3.2 km || 
|-id=019 bgcolor=#d6d6d6
| 421019 ||  || — || November 30, 2005 || Mount Lemmon || Mount Lemmon Survey ||  || align=right | 2.4 km || 
|-id=020 bgcolor=#d6d6d6
| 421020 ||  || — || March 12, 2007 || Kitt Peak || Spacewatch || — || align=right | 2.8 km || 
|-id=021 bgcolor=#E9E9E9
| 421021 ||  || — || November 25, 2005 || Mount Lemmon || Mount Lemmon Survey || — || align=right | 2.9 km || 
|-id=022 bgcolor=#d6d6d6
| 421022 ||  || — || December 13, 2004 || Kitt Peak || Spacewatch || — || align=right | 3.3 km || 
|-id=023 bgcolor=#d6d6d6
| 421023 ||  || — || September 29, 2003 || Kitt Peak || Spacewatch || — || align=right | 2.4 km || 
|-id=024 bgcolor=#E9E9E9
| 421024 ||  || — || October 10, 1996 || Kitt Peak || Spacewatch || — || align=right | 1.6 km || 
|-id=025 bgcolor=#E9E9E9
| 421025 ||  || — || October 28, 2005 || Campo Imperatore || CINEOS || — || align=right | 1.5 km || 
|-id=026 bgcolor=#d6d6d6
| 421026 ||  || — || September 19, 2003 || Kitt Peak || Spacewatch || — || align=right | 2.5 km || 
|-id=027 bgcolor=#E9E9E9
| 421027 ||  || — || November 1, 2005 || Mount Lemmon || Mount Lemmon Survey || — || align=right | 2.2 km || 
|-id=028 bgcolor=#E9E9E9
| 421028 ||  || — || November 27, 2000 || Kitt Peak || Spacewatch || — || align=right | 2.0 km || 
|-id=029 bgcolor=#E9E9E9
| 421029 ||  || — || August 27, 2009 || Kitt Peak || Spacewatch || — || align=right | 1.4 km || 
|-id=030 bgcolor=#d6d6d6
| 421030 ||  || — || December 13, 2009 || Mount Lemmon || Mount Lemmon Survey || — || align=right | 3.5 km || 
|-id=031 bgcolor=#d6d6d6
| 421031 ||  || — || November 24, 2009 || Kitt Peak || Spacewatch || — || align=right | 2.0 km || 
|-id=032 bgcolor=#C2FFFF
| 421032 ||  || — || April 3, 2008 || Mount Lemmon || Mount Lemmon Survey || L5 || align=right | 9.6 km || 
|-id=033 bgcolor=#d6d6d6
| 421033 ||  || — || December 27, 2009 || Kitt Peak || Spacewatch || EOS || align=right | 1.8 km || 
|-id=034 bgcolor=#E9E9E9
| 421034 ||  || — || February 24, 2012 || Kitt Peak || Spacewatch || — || align=right | 1.1 km || 
|-id=035 bgcolor=#d6d6d6
| 421035 ||  || — || November 3, 2008 || Mount Lemmon || Mount Lemmon Survey || — || align=right | 3.1 km || 
|-id=036 bgcolor=#d6d6d6
| 421036 ||  || — || October 2, 2006 || Mount Lemmon || Mount Lemmon Survey || 3:2 || align=right | 3.6 km || 
|-id=037 bgcolor=#fefefe
| 421037 ||  || — || September 16, 2006 || Kitt Peak || Spacewatch || — || align=right data-sort-value="0.80" | 800 m || 
|-id=038 bgcolor=#E9E9E9
| 421038 ||  || — || September 11, 2004 || Kitt Peak || Spacewatch || — || align=right | 2.5 km || 
|-id=039 bgcolor=#E9E9E9
| 421039 ||  || — || March 16, 2007 || Kitt Peak || Spacewatch || — || align=right | 2.5 km || 
|-id=040 bgcolor=#E9E9E9
| 421040 ||  || — || March 25, 2012 || Mount Lemmon || Mount Lemmon Survey ||  || align=right | 2.7 km || 
|-id=041 bgcolor=#d6d6d6
| 421041 ||  || — || August 4, 2002 || Palomar || NEAT || — || align=right | 2.9 km || 
|-id=042 bgcolor=#d6d6d6
| 421042 ||  || — || September 26, 2003 || ESA OGS || SDSS || — || align=right | 2.6 km || 
|-id=043 bgcolor=#fefefe
| 421043 ||  || — || October 2, 2006 || Mount Lemmon || Mount Lemmon Survey || — || align=right data-sort-value="0.89" | 890 m || 
|-id=044 bgcolor=#E9E9E9
| 421044 ||  || — || April 1, 2008 || Kitt Peak || Spacewatch || — || align=right | 1.1 km || 
|-id=045 bgcolor=#d6d6d6
| 421045 ||  || — || September 21, 2003 || Kitt Peak || Spacewatch || — || align=right | 3.0 km || 
|-id=046 bgcolor=#d6d6d6
| 421046 ||  || — || February 7, 2006 || Mount Lemmon || Mount Lemmon Survey || — || align=right | 3.4 km || 
|-id=047 bgcolor=#d6d6d6
| 421047 ||  || — || September 4, 2003 || Kitt Peak || Spacewatch || KOR || align=right | 1.5 km || 
|-id=048 bgcolor=#d6d6d6
| 421048 ||  || — || September 18, 2003 || Kitt Peak || Spacewatch || — || align=right | 3.9 km || 
|-id=049 bgcolor=#E9E9E9
| 421049 ||  || — || October 1, 2009 || Mount Lemmon || Mount Lemmon Survey || — || align=right | 2.2 km || 
|-id=050 bgcolor=#d6d6d6
| 421050 ||  || — || November 21, 2003 || Palomar || NEAT || — || align=right | 4.1 km || 
|-id=051 bgcolor=#E9E9E9
| 421051 ||  || — || October 13, 1999 || Apache Point || SDSS || — || align=right | 2.3 km || 
|-id=052 bgcolor=#fefefe
| 421052 ||  || — || March 2, 2005 || Socorro || LINEAR || — || align=right | 1.4 km || 
|-id=053 bgcolor=#E9E9E9
| 421053 ||  || — || July 29, 2009 || Kitt Peak || Spacewatch || — || align=right | 1.2 km || 
|-id=054 bgcolor=#d6d6d6
| 421054 ||  || — || September 23, 2008 || Kitt Peak || Spacewatch || — || align=right | 3.0 km || 
|-id=055 bgcolor=#E9E9E9
| 421055 ||  || — || January 11, 2011 || Kitt Peak || Spacewatch || — || align=right | 1.9 km || 
|-id=056 bgcolor=#d6d6d6
| 421056 ||  || — || March 15, 2007 || Kitt Peak || Spacewatch || KOR || align=right | 1.3 km || 
|-id=057 bgcolor=#d6d6d6
| 421057 ||  || — || April 22, 2007 || Kitt Peak || Spacewatch || — || align=right | 2.1 km || 
|-id=058 bgcolor=#d6d6d6
| 421058 ||  || — || November 17, 2009 || Mount Lemmon || Mount Lemmon Survey || EOS || align=right | 1.9 km || 
|-id=059 bgcolor=#d6d6d6
| 421059 ||  || — || September 9, 2008 || Mount Lemmon || Mount Lemmon Survey || — || align=right | 2.7 km || 
|-id=060 bgcolor=#E9E9E9
| 421060 ||  || — || March 12, 2002 || Palomar || NEAT || — || align=right | 2.8 km || 
|-id=061 bgcolor=#d6d6d6
| 421061 ||  || — || September 20, 2001 || Apache Point || SDSS || — || align=right | 6.1 km || 
|-id=062 bgcolor=#E9E9E9
| 421062 ||  || — || March 20, 2007 || Mount Lemmon || Mount Lemmon Survey || — || align=right | 1.5 km || 
|-id=063 bgcolor=#d6d6d6
| 421063 ||  || — || January 13, 2005 || Catalina || CSS || — || align=right | 3.6 km || 
|-id=064 bgcolor=#d6d6d6
| 421064 ||  || — || October 7, 2008 || Mount Lemmon || Mount Lemmon Survey || — || align=right | 3.8 km || 
|-id=065 bgcolor=#fefefe
| 421065 ||  || — || September 19, 2006 || Kitt Peak || Spacewatch || — || align=right data-sort-value="0.90" | 900 m || 
|-id=066 bgcolor=#d6d6d6
| 421066 ||  || — || December 18, 2004 || Mount Lemmon || Mount Lemmon Survey || — || align=right | 2.8 km || 
|-id=067 bgcolor=#d6d6d6
| 421067 ||  || — || February 25, 2006 || Kitt Peak || Spacewatch || — || align=right | 2.9 km || 
|-id=068 bgcolor=#d6d6d6
| 421068 ||  || — || November 25, 2009 || Kitt Peak || Spacewatch || — || align=right | 2.7 km || 
|-id=069 bgcolor=#d6d6d6
| 421069 ||  || — || September 28, 2008 || Mount Lemmon || Mount Lemmon Survey || — || align=right | 2.8 km || 
|-id=070 bgcolor=#d6d6d6
| 421070 ||  || — || February 8, 2011 || Mount Lemmon || Mount Lemmon Survey || — || align=right | 2.7 km || 
|-id=071 bgcolor=#E9E9E9
| 421071 ||  || — || January 27, 2007 || Mount Lemmon || Mount Lemmon Survey || — || align=right | 1.6 km || 
|-id=072 bgcolor=#d6d6d6
| 421072 ||  || — || March 25, 2010 || WISE || WISE || — || align=right | 4.9 km || 
|-id=073 bgcolor=#E9E9E9
| 421073 ||  || — || November 1, 2005 || Mount Lemmon || Mount Lemmon Survey || — || align=right | 1.4 km || 
|-id=074 bgcolor=#d6d6d6
| 421074 ||  || — || October 18, 2003 || Kitt Peak || Spacewatch || — || align=right | 2.3 km || 
|-id=075 bgcolor=#d6d6d6
| 421075 ||  || — || March 4, 2005 || Kitt Peak || Spacewatch || EOS || align=right | 1.9 km || 
|-id=076 bgcolor=#d6d6d6
| 421076 ||  || — || December 11, 2009 || Mount Lemmon || Mount Lemmon Survey || — || align=right | 3.1 km || 
|-id=077 bgcolor=#fefefe
| 421077 ||  || — || October 13, 2010 || Mount Lemmon || Mount Lemmon Survey || V || align=right data-sort-value="0.65" | 650 m || 
|-id=078 bgcolor=#d6d6d6
| 421078 ||  || — || September 23, 2008 || Kitt Peak || Spacewatch || — || align=right | 2.9 km || 
|-id=079 bgcolor=#E9E9E9
| 421079 ||  || — || October 7, 2004 || Kitt Peak || Spacewatch || — || align=right | 2.1 km || 
|-id=080 bgcolor=#d6d6d6
| 421080 ||  || — || December 19, 2004 || Kitt Peak || Spacewatch || — || align=right | 3.5 km || 
|-id=081 bgcolor=#E9E9E9
| 421081 ||  || — || October 23, 2009 || Mount Lemmon || Mount Lemmon Survey || — || align=right | 2.1 km || 
|-id=082 bgcolor=#d6d6d6
| 421082 ||  || — || March 31, 2012 || Mount Lemmon || Mount Lemmon Survey || — || align=right | 3.0 km || 
|-id=083 bgcolor=#E9E9E9
| 421083 ||  || — || October 24, 2009 || Kitt Peak || Spacewatch || — || align=right | 2.2 km || 
|-id=084 bgcolor=#d6d6d6
| 421084 ||  || — || September 19, 2003 || Palomar || NEAT || — || align=right | 2.1 km || 
|-id=085 bgcolor=#d6d6d6
| 421085 ||  || — || July 24, 2003 || Palomar || NEAT || BRA || align=right | 2.2 km || 
|-id=086 bgcolor=#fefefe
| 421086 ||  || — || October 2, 1999 || Kitt Peak || Spacewatch || — || align=right data-sort-value="0.92" | 920 m || 
|-id=087 bgcolor=#d6d6d6
| 421087 ||  || — || November 22, 2009 || Mount Lemmon || Mount Lemmon Survey || — || align=right | 2.9 km || 
|-id=088 bgcolor=#E9E9E9
| 421088 ||  || — || October 7, 2004 || Kitt Peak || Spacewatch || HOF || align=right | 2.7 km || 
|-id=089 bgcolor=#d6d6d6
| 421089 ||  || — || September 22, 2008 || Kitt Peak || Spacewatch || — || align=right | 3.2 km || 
|-id=090 bgcolor=#d6d6d6
| 421090 ||  || — || September 29, 2003 || Kitt Peak || Spacewatch || — || align=right | 2.4 km || 
|-id=091 bgcolor=#d6d6d6
| 421091 ||  || — || October 23, 2003 || Apache Point || SDSS || — || align=right | 2.7 km || 
|-id=092 bgcolor=#d6d6d6
| 421092 ||  || — || April 24, 2007 || Kitt Peak || Spacewatch || — || align=right | 2.3 km || 
|-id=093 bgcolor=#E9E9E9
| 421093 ||  || — || September 13, 2004 || Kitt Peak || Spacewatch || — || align=right | 2.3 km || 
|-id=094 bgcolor=#fefefe
| 421094 ||  || — || August 18, 2006 || Kitt Peak || Spacewatch || — || align=right data-sort-value="0.94" | 940 m || 
|-id=095 bgcolor=#d6d6d6
| 421095 ||  || — || May 16, 2012 || Kitt Peak || Spacewatch || — || align=right | 3.1 km || 
|-id=096 bgcolor=#d6d6d6
| 421096 ||  || — || November 20, 2008 || Mount Lemmon || Mount Lemmon Survey || — || align=right | 3.3 km || 
|-id=097 bgcolor=#E9E9E9
| 421097 ||  || — || March 26, 2007 || Mount Lemmon || Mount Lemmon Survey || HOF || align=right | 2.7 km || 
|-id=098 bgcolor=#E9E9E9
| 421098 ||  || — || February 23, 2012 || Kitt Peak || Spacewatch || — || align=right | 1.5 km || 
|-id=099 bgcolor=#E9E9E9
| 421099 ||  || — || March 9, 2003 || Palomar || NEAT || — || align=right | 2.2 km || 
|-id=100 bgcolor=#d6d6d6
| 421100 ||  || — || March 11, 2011 || Kitt Peak || Spacewatch || EOS || align=right | 1.9 km || 
|}

421101–421200 

|-bgcolor=#d6d6d6
| 421101 ||  || — || February 1, 2006 || Mount Lemmon || Mount Lemmon Survey || — || align=right | 3.3 km || 
|-id=102 bgcolor=#E9E9E9
| 421102 ||  || — || March 26, 2004 || Kitt Peak || Spacewatch || — || align=right data-sort-value="0.96" | 960 m || 
|-id=103 bgcolor=#d6d6d6
| 421103 ||  || — || May 18, 2007 || Kitt Peak || Spacewatch || — || align=right | 2.9 km || 
|-id=104 bgcolor=#d6d6d6
| 421104 ||  || — || October 29, 2008 || Mount Lemmon || Mount Lemmon Survey || — || align=right | 3.1 km || 
|-id=105 bgcolor=#E9E9E9
| 421105 ||  || — || September 16, 2009 || Kitt Peak || Spacewatch || — || align=right | 1.4 km || 
|-id=106 bgcolor=#d6d6d6
| 421106 ||  || — || January 16, 2005 || Kitt Peak || Spacewatch || — || align=right | 3.4 km || 
|-id=107 bgcolor=#d6d6d6
| 421107 ||  || — || March 9, 2005 || Kitt Peak || Spacewatch || — || align=right | 3.3 km || 
|-id=108 bgcolor=#d6d6d6
| 421108 ||  || — || May 10, 2007 || Mount Lemmon || Mount Lemmon Survey || — || align=right | 2.5 km || 
|-id=109 bgcolor=#d6d6d6
| 421109 ||  || — || December 10, 2010 || Mount Lemmon || Mount Lemmon Survey || — || align=right | 3.1 km || 
|-id=110 bgcolor=#fefefe
| 421110 ||  || — || June 14, 2009 || Kitt Peak || Spacewatch || — || align=right data-sort-value="0.94" | 940 m || 
|-id=111 bgcolor=#E9E9E9
| 421111 ||  || — || January 13, 2002 || Kitt Peak || Spacewatch || — || align=right | 3.2 km || 
|-id=112 bgcolor=#fefefe
| 421112 ||  || — || December 25, 2010 || Mount Lemmon || Mount Lemmon Survey || — || align=right | 1.4 km || 
|-id=113 bgcolor=#E9E9E9
| 421113 ||  || — || September 11, 2004 || Socorro || LINEAR || — || align=right | 3.3 km || 
|-id=114 bgcolor=#E9E9E9
| 421114 ||  || — || June 11, 2004 || Palomar || NEAT || — || align=right | 1.6 km || 
|-id=115 bgcolor=#fefefe
| 421115 ||  || — || March 28, 2008 || Kitt Peak || Spacewatch || — || align=right | 1.3 km || 
|-id=116 bgcolor=#E9E9E9
| 421116 ||  || — || October 23, 2005 || Catalina || CSS || — || align=right | 1.9 km || 
|-id=117 bgcolor=#E9E9E9
| 421117 ||  || — || July 30, 2005 || Palomar || NEAT || — || align=right | 1.0 km || 
|-id=118 bgcolor=#E9E9E9
| 421118 ||  || — || August 16, 2009 || Kitt Peak || Spacewatch || — || align=right | 1.1 km || 
|-id=119 bgcolor=#d6d6d6
| 421119 ||  || — || September 22, 2008 || Kitt Peak || Spacewatch || — || align=right | 3.3 km || 
|-id=120 bgcolor=#d6d6d6
| 421120 ||  || — || August 24, 2008 || Kitt Peak || Spacewatch || — || align=right | 2.5 km || 
|-id=121 bgcolor=#d6d6d6
| 421121 ||  || — || February 14, 2005 || Kitt Peak || Spacewatch || — || align=right | 3.1 km || 
|-id=122 bgcolor=#E9E9E9
| 421122 ||  || — || December 30, 2000 || Kitt Peak || Spacewatch || — || align=right | 2.3 km || 
|-id=123 bgcolor=#d6d6d6
| 421123 ||  || — || September 26, 2008 || Kitt Peak || Spacewatch || — || align=right | 2.8 km || 
|-id=124 bgcolor=#E9E9E9
| 421124 ||  || — || August 8, 2004 || Socorro || LINEAR || — || align=right | 1.6 km || 
|-id=125 bgcolor=#fefefe
| 421125 ||  || — || October 3, 2006 || Mount Lemmon || Mount Lemmon Survey || — || align=right | 1.0 km || 
|-id=126 bgcolor=#d6d6d6
| 421126 ||  || — || August 28, 2005 || Anderson Mesa || LONEOS || 3:2 || align=right | 5.3 km || 
|-id=127 bgcolor=#fefefe
| 421127 ||  || — || January 10, 2000 || Črni Vrh || Spacewatch || NYS || align=right data-sort-value="0.84" | 840 m || 
|-id=128 bgcolor=#d6d6d6
| 421128 ||  || — || October 12, 1999 || Kitt Peak || Spacewatch || — || align=right | 1.7 km || 
|-id=129 bgcolor=#E9E9E9
| 421129 ||  || — || March 31, 1995 || Kitt Peak || Spacewatch || — || align=right | 1.1 km || 
|-id=130 bgcolor=#E9E9E9
| 421130 ||  || — || October 22, 2005 || Kitt Peak || Spacewatch || — || align=right | 1.6 km || 
|-id=131 bgcolor=#d6d6d6
| 421131 ||  || — || February 27, 2006 || Mount Lemmon || Mount Lemmon Survey || — || align=right | 2.4 km || 
|-id=132 bgcolor=#d6d6d6
| 421132 ||  || — || January 20, 2009 || Mount Lemmon || Mount Lemmon Survey || — || align=right | 3.6 km || 
|-id=133 bgcolor=#E9E9E9
| 421133 ||  || — || March 13, 2011 || Catalina || CSS || — || align=right | 2.9 km || 
|-id=134 bgcolor=#C2FFFF
| 421134 ||  || — || September 11, 2001 || Kitt Peak || Spacewatch || L5 || align=right | 8.2 km || 
|-id=135 bgcolor=#d6d6d6
| 421135 ||  || — || August 15, 2013 || Haleakala || Pan-STARRS || — || align=right | 2.7 km || 
|-id=136 bgcolor=#d6d6d6
| 421136 ||  || — || August 15, 2013 || Haleakala || Pan-STARRS || — || align=right | 3.1 km || 
|-id=137 bgcolor=#d6d6d6
| 421137 ||  || — || September 9, 2008 || Mount Lemmon || Mount Lemmon Survey || — || align=right | 2.4 km || 
|-id=138 bgcolor=#d6d6d6
| 421138 ||  || — || September 27, 2008 || Mount Lemmon || Mount Lemmon Survey || — || align=right | 3.1 km || 
|-id=139 bgcolor=#E9E9E9
| 421139 ||  || — || July 26, 1995 || Kitt Peak || Spacewatch || — || align=right | 2.0 km || 
|-id=140 bgcolor=#d6d6d6
| 421140 ||  || — || February 22, 2011 || Kitt Peak || Spacewatch || EOS || align=right | 1.7 km || 
|-id=141 bgcolor=#E9E9E9
| 421141 ||  || — || September 25, 2005 || Kitt Peak || Spacewatch || — || align=right | 1.1 km || 
|-id=142 bgcolor=#d6d6d6
| 421142 ||  || — || September 22, 2008 || Catalina || CSS || — || align=right | 3.0 km || 
|-id=143 bgcolor=#d6d6d6
| 421143 ||  || — || September 12, 2002 || Palomar || NEAT || EOS || align=right | 2.3 km || 
|-id=144 bgcolor=#d6d6d6
| 421144 ||  || — || October 10, 2008 || Mount Lemmon || Mount Lemmon Survey || — || align=right | 2.7 km || 
|-id=145 bgcolor=#d6d6d6
| 421145 ||  || — || April 6, 2010 || WISE || WISE || — || align=right | 2.9 km || 
|-id=146 bgcolor=#C2FFFF
| 421146 ||  || — || September 11, 2001 || Kitt Peak || Spacewatch || L5 || align=right | 9.0 km || 
|-id=147 bgcolor=#d6d6d6
| 421147 ||  || — || October 6, 2002 || Palomar || NEAT || EOS || align=right | 2.4 km || 
|-id=148 bgcolor=#d6d6d6
| 421148 ||  || — || September 11, 2007 || Kitt Peak || Spacewatch || THM || align=right | 2.5 km || 
|-id=149 bgcolor=#d6d6d6
| 421149 ||  || — || June 26, 2007 || Palomar || CSS || TIR || align=right | 4.0 km || 
|-id=150 bgcolor=#E9E9E9
| 421150 ||  || — || September 30, 2005 || Catalina || CSS || — || align=right | 1.9 km || 
|-id=151 bgcolor=#E9E9E9
| 421151 ||  || — || August 22, 2004 || Kitt Peak || Spacewatch || — || align=right | 1.7 km || 
|-id=152 bgcolor=#E9E9E9
| 421152 ||  || — || March 16, 2002 || Socorro || LINEAR || DOR || align=right | 3.1 km || 
|-id=153 bgcolor=#d6d6d6
| 421153 ||  || — || April 8, 2006 || Kitt Peak || Spacewatch || — || align=right | 3.2 km || 
|-id=154 bgcolor=#fefefe
| 421154 ||  || — || September 17, 2003 || Palomar || NEAT || — || align=right | 1.0 km || 
|-id=155 bgcolor=#d6d6d6
| 421155 ||  || — || September 19, 2003 || Kitt Peak || Spacewatch || EOS || align=right | 2.7 km || 
|-id=156 bgcolor=#E9E9E9
| 421156 ||  || — || July 13, 2004 || Siding Spring || SSS || — || align=right | 1.7 km || 
|-id=157 bgcolor=#fefefe
| 421157 ||  || — || November 3, 2010 || Mount Lemmon || Mount Lemmon Survey || — || align=right data-sort-value="0.84" | 840 m || 
|-id=158 bgcolor=#d6d6d6
| 421158 ||  || — || October 6, 1996 || Kitt Peak || Spacewatch || — || align=right | 4.1 km || 
|-id=159 bgcolor=#d6d6d6
| 421159 ||  || — || October 22, 2008 || Kitt Peak || Spacewatch || — || align=right | 3.0 km || 
|-id=160 bgcolor=#d6d6d6
| 421160 ||  || — || October 9, 2008 || Kitt Peak || Spacewatch || VER || align=right | 2.4 km || 
|-id=161 bgcolor=#d6d6d6
| 421161 ||  || — || March 29, 2010 || WISE || WISE || — || align=right | 3.7 km || 
|-id=162 bgcolor=#d6d6d6
| 421162 ||  || — || April 14, 2007 || Mount Lemmon || Mount Lemmon Survey || — || align=right | 3.2 km || 
|-id=163 bgcolor=#d6d6d6
| 421163 ||  || — || September 12, 2002 || Palomar || NEAT || EOS || align=right | 2.2 km || 
|-id=164 bgcolor=#E9E9E9
| 421164 ||  || — || January 11, 2003 || Kitt Peak || Spacewatch || — || align=right | 1.3 km || 
|-id=165 bgcolor=#d6d6d6
| 421165 ||  || — || October 3, 2002 || Palomar || NEAT || — || align=right | 4.7 km || 
|-id=166 bgcolor=#d6d6d6
| 421166 ||  || — || December 19, 2003 || Kitt Peak || Spacewatch || — || align=right | 3.8 km || 
|-id=167 bgcolor=#d6d6d6
| 421167 ||  || — || September 5, 2008 || Kitt Peak || Spacewatch || EOS || align=right | 2.1 km || 
|-id=168 bgcolor=#C2FFFF
| 421168 ||  || — || December 15, 2006 || Mount Lemmon || Mount Lemmon Survey || L5 || align=right | 12 km || 
|-id=169 bgcolor=#d6d6d6
| 421169 ||  || — || December 28, 2003 || Kitt Peak || Spacewatch || — || align=right | 3.5 km || 
|-id=170 bgcolor=#d6d6d6
| 421170 ||  || — || August 19, 2006 || Kitt Peak || Spacewatch || 7:4 || align=right | 4.5 km || 
|-id=171 bgcolor=#fefefe
| 421171 ||  || — || February 8, 2008 || Kitt Peak || Spacewatch || — || align=right data-sort-value="0.85" | 850 m || 
|-id=172 bgcolor=#E9E9E9
| 421172 ||  || — || December 21, 2005 || Kitt Peak || Spacewatch || WIT || align=right | 1.1 km || 
|-id=173 bgcolor=#E9E9E9
| 421173 ||  || — || September 21, 2001 || Socorro || LINEAR || — || align=right | 1.1 km || 
|-id=174 bgcolor=#d6d6d6
| 421174 ||  || — || March 8, 2005 || Mount Lemmon || Mount Lemmon Survey || EOS || align=right | 2.2 km || 
|-id=175 bgcolor=#fefefe
| 421175 ||  || — || June 19, 2009 || Kitt Peak || Spacewatch || V || align=right data-sort-value="0.82" | 820 m || 
|-id=176 bgcolor=#d6d6d6
| 421176 ||  || — || September 30, 1997 || Kitt Peak || Spacewatch || — || align=right | 3.1 km || 
|-id=177 bgcolor=#d6d6d6
| 421177 ||  || — || March 14, 2011 || Mount Lemmon || Mount Lemmon Survey || — || align=right | 2.8 km || 
|-id=178 bgcolor=#d6d6d6
| 421178 ||  || — || September 28, 2008 || Mount Lemmon || Mount Lemmon Survey || — || align=right | 3.3 km || 
|-id=179 bgcolor=#d6d6d6
| 421179 ||  || — || September 19, 2003 || Kitt Peak || Spacewatch || EOS || align=right | 2.0 km || 
|-id=180 bgcolor=#fefefe
| 421180 ||  || — || August 19, 2006 || Kitt Peak || Spacewatch || — || align=right data-sort-value="0.80" | 800 m || 
|-id=181 bgcolor=#fefefe
| 421181 ||  || — || April 2, 2005 || Mount Lemmon || Mount Lemmon Survey || — || align=right data-sort-value="0.73" | 730 m || 
|-id=182 bgcolor=#E9E9E9
| 421182 ||  || — || March 11, 2007 || Mount Lemmon || Mount Lemmon Survey || MAR || align=right | 1.0 km || 
|-id=183 bgcolor=#d6d6d6
| 421183 ||  || — || November 22, 2008 || Socorro || LINEAR || TIR || align=right | 6.1 km || 
|-id=184 bgcolor=#E9E9E9
| 421184 ||  || — || February 12, 2002 || Palomar || NEAT || — || align=right | 3.0 km || 
|-id=185 bgcolor=#E9E9E9
| 421185 ||  || — || September 1, 2005 || Kitt Peak || Spacewatch || — || align=right | 1.2 km || 
|-id=186 bgcolor=#d6d6d6
| 421186 ||  || — || February 16, 2010 || Kitt Peak || Spacewatch || — || align=right | 2.7 km || 
|-id=187 bgcolor=#E9E9E9
| 421187 ||  || — || March 9, 2007 || Kitt Peak || Spacewatch || — || align=right | 2.7 km || 
|-id=188 bgcolor=#d6d6d6
| 421188 ||  || — || September 24, 2008 || Mount Lemmon || Mount Lemmon Survey || — || align=right | 2.4 km || 
|-id=189 bgcolor=#fefefe
| 421189 ||  || — || January 30, 2004 || Kitt Peak || Spacewatch || — || align=right data-sort-value="0.87" | 870 m || 
|-id=190 bgcolor=#d6d6d6
| 421190 ||  || — || April 10, 2005 || Mount Lemmon || Mount Lemmon Survey || — || align=right | 3.7 km || 
|-id=191 bgcolor=#d6d6d6
| 421191 ||  || — || September 13, 2002 || Palomar || NEAT || — || align=right | 3.6 km || 
|-id=192 bgcolor=#d6d6d6
| 421192 ||  || — || September 28, 2008 || Mount Lemmon || Mount Lemmon Survey || HYG || align=right | 3.2 km || 
|-id=193 bgcolor=#d6d6d6
| 421193 ||  || — || November 4, 2004 || Kitt Peak || Spacewatch || KOR || align=right | 1.5 km || 
|-id=194 bgcolor=#E9E9E9
| 421194 ||  || — || January 27, 2006 || Mount Lemmon || Mount Lemmon Survey || — || align=right | 2.1 km || 
|-id=195 bgcolor=#E9E9E9
| 421195 ||  || — || November 23, 2009 || Mount Lemmon || Mount Lemmon Survey || — || align=right | 2.4 km || 
|-id=196 bgcolor=#E9E9E9
| 421196 ||  || — || September 13, 2004 || Socorro || LINEAR || — || align=right | 2.0 km || 
|-id=197 bgcolor=#E9E9E9
| 421197 ||  || — || November 11, 2004 || Kitt Peak || Spacewatch || — || align=right | 2.7 km || 
|-id=198 bgcolor=#d6d6d6
| 421198 ||  || — || January 16, 2010 || Mount Lemmon || Mount Lemmon Survey || EOS || align=right | 1.9 km || 
|-id=199 bgcolor=#E9E9E9
| 421199 ||  || — || February 6, 2007 || Kitt Peak || Spacewatch || — || align=right | 1.7 km || 
|-id=200 bgcolor=#d6d6d6
| 421200 ||  || — || March 11, 2005 || Mount Lemmon || Mount Lemmon Survey || — || align=right | 3.3 km || 
|}

421201–421300 

|-bgcolor=#d6d6d6
| 421201 ||  || — || April 10, 2010 || WISE || WISE || — || align=right | 3.2 km || 
|-id=202 bgcolor=#fefefe
| 421202 ||  || — || September 26, 2006 || Kitt Peak || Spacewatch || — || align=right data-sort-value="0.92" | 920 m || 
|-id=203 bgcolor=#fefefe
| 421203 ||  || — || January 13, 2011 || Kitt Peak || Spacewatch || — || align=right | 1.0 km || 
|-id=204 bgcolor=#d6d6d6
| 421204 ||  || — || August 23, 2007 || Kitt Peak || Spacewatch || — || align=right | 2.8 km || 
|-id=205 bgcolor=#d6d6d6
| 421205 ||  || — || October 16, 2003 || Kitt Peak || Spacewatch || — || align=right | 3.1 km || 
|-id=206 bgcolor=#d6d6d6
| 421206 ||  || — || September 22, 2003 || Kitt Peak || Spacewatch || — || align=right | 1.9 km || 
|-id=207 bgcolor=#fefefe
| 421207 ||  || — || February 12, 2004 || Kitt Peak || Spacewatch || — || align=right | 1.1 km || 
|-id=208 bgcolor=#d6d6d6
| 421208 ||  || — || January 19, 2004 || Anderson Mesa || LONEOS || — || align=right | 3.4 km || 
|-id=209 bgcolor=#d6d6d6
| 421209 ||  || — || May 20, 2006 || Siding Spring || SSS || — || align=right | 5.6 km || 
|-id=210 bgcolor=#d6d6d6
| 421210 ||  || — || April 19, 2007 || Kitt Peak || Spacewatch || — || align=right | 3.0 km || 
|-id=211 bgcolor=#d6d6d6
| 421211 ||  || — || March 4, 2005 || Catalina || CSS || — || align=right | 3.9 km || 
|-id=212 bgcolor=#d6d6d6
| 421212 ||  || — || March 2, 2006 || Kitt Peak || Spacewatch || — || align=right | 2.8 km || 
|-id=213 bgcolor=#fefefe
| 421213 ||  || — || February 9, 2008 || Mount Lemmon || Mount Lemmon Survey || — || align=right | 1.0 km || 
|-id=214 bgcolor=#d6d6d6
| 421214 ||  || — || September 29, 2008 || Mount Lemmon || Mount Lemmon Survey || — || align=right | 3.1 km || 
|-id=215 bgcolor=#d6d6d6
| 421215 ||  || — || March 25, 2006 || Kitt Peak || Spacewatch || — || align=right | 3.8 km || 
|-id=216 bgcolor=#d6d6d6
| 421216 ||  || — || September 5, 2007 || Mount Lemmon || Mount Lemmon Survey || HYG || align=right | 3.0 km || 
|-id=217 bgcolor=#E9E9E9
| 421217 ||  || — || January 28, 2006 || Kitt Peak || Spacewatch || — || align=right | 3.1 km || 
|-id=218 bgcolor=#d6d6d6
| 421218 ||  || — || September 13, 2007 || Mount Lemmon || Mount Lemmon Survey || 7:4 || align=right | 3.4 km || 
|-id=219 bgcolor=#E9E9E9
| 421219 ||  || — || January 23, 2006 || Kitt Peak || Spacewatch || — || align=right | 3.1 km || 
|-id=220 bgcolor=#E9E9E9
| 421220 ||  || — || November 1, 2005 || Mount Lemmon || Mount Lemmon Survey || — || align=right | 1.7 km || 
|-id=221 bgcolor=#d6d6d6
| 421221 ||  || — || November 21, 2008 || Mount Lemmon || Mount Lemmon Survey || THM || align=right | 2.8 km || 
|-id=222 bgcolor=#d6d6d6
| 421222 ||  || — || April 2, 2005 || Mount Lemmon || Mount Lemmon Survey || EOS || align=right | 1.9 km || 
|-id=223 bgcolor=#E9E9E9
| 421223 ||  || — || September 11, 2004 || Kitt Peak || Spacewatch || — || align=right | 2.2 km || 
|-id=224 bgcolor=#d6d6d6
| 421224 ||  || — || November 30, 1999 || Kitt Peak || Spacewatch || KOR || align=right | 1.5 km || 
|-id=225 bgcolor=#d6d6d6
| 421225 ||  || — || March 1, 2005 || Kitt Peak || Spacewatch || — || align=right | 3.6 km || 
|-id=226 bgcolor=#E9E9E9
| 421226 ||  || — || April 16, 2007 || Mount Lemmon || Mount Lemmon Survey || — || align=right | 2.0 km || 
|-id=227 bgcolor=#d6d6d6
| 421227 ||  || — || September 13, 2013 || Mount Lemmon || Mount Lemmon Survey || — || align=right | 2.8 km || 
|-id=228 bgcolor=#d6d6d6
| 421228 ||  || — || September 24, 2008 || Kitt Peak || Spacewatch || EOS || align=right | 2.1 km || 
|-id=229 bgcolor=#E9E9E9
| 421229 ||  || — || October 18, 2009 || Mount Lemmon || Mount Lemmon Survey || MRX || align=right | 1.2 km || 
|-id=230 bgcolor=#E9E9E9
| 421230 ||  || — || January 13, 2002 || Socorro || LINEAR || — || align=right | 2.5 km || 
|-id=231 bgcolor=#d6d6d6
| 421231 ||  || — || October 29, 1999 || Kitt Peak || Spacewatch || KOR || align=right | 1.2 km || 
|-id=232 bgcolor=#fefefe
| 421232 ||  || — || November 20, 2003 || Socorro || LINEAR || — || align=right | 1.5 km || 
|-id=233 bgcolor=#d6d6d6
| 421233 ||  || — || April 18, 2006 || Kitt Peak || Spacewatch || KOR || align=right | 1.7 km || 
|-id=234 bgcolor=#d6d6d6
| 421234 ||  || — || January 17, 2005 || Kitt Peak || Spacewatch || — || align=right | 3.6 km || 
|-id=235 bgcolor=#d6d6d6
| 421235 ||  || — || April 25, 2006 || Kitt Peak || Spacewatch || (1298) || align=right | 4.0 km || 
|-id=236 bgcolor=#E9E9E9
| 421236 ||  || — || April 19, 2007 || Mount Lemmon || Mount Lemmon Survey || — || align=right | 2.6 km || 
|-id=237 bgcolor=#E9E9E9
| 421237 ||  || — || September 30, 2009 || Mount Lemmon || Mount Lemmon Survey || WIT || align=right | 1.3 km || 
|-id=238 bgcolor=#E9E9E9
| 421238 ||  || — || November 26, 2005 || Catalina || CSS || EUN || align=right | 1.5 km || 
|-id=239 bgcolor=#E9E9E9
| 421239 ||  || — || January 8, 1999 || Kitt Peak || Spacewatch || — || align=right | 1.3 km || 
|-id=240 bgcolor=#d6d6d6
| 421240 ||  || — || April 28, 2012 || Mount Lemmon || Mount Lemmon Survey || — || align=right | 3.1 km || 
|-id=241 bgcolor=#d6d6d6
| 421241 ||  || — || July 29, 2008 || Mount Lemmon || Mount Lemmon Survey || — || align=right | 2.1 km || 
|-id=242 bgcolor=#E9E9E9
| 421242 ||  || — || October 24, 2009 || Kitt Peak || Spacewatch || — || align=right | 1.8 km || 
|-id=243 bgcolor=#E9E9E9
| 421243 ||  || — || January 14, 2002 || Kitt Peak || Spacewatch || — || align=right | 2.0 km || 
|-id=244 bgcolor=#fefefe
| 421244 ||  || — || April 18, 2012 || Mount Lemmon || Mount Lemmon Survey || — || align=right data-sort-value="0.94" | 940 m || 
|-id=245 bgcolor=#E9E9E9
| 421245 ||  || — || January 26, 2006 || Kitt Peak || Spacewatch || AST || align=right | 2.1 km || 
|-id=246 bgcolor=#d6d6d6
| 421246 ||  || — || January 18, 2004 || Palomar || NEAT || — || align=right | 3.3 km || 
|-id=247 bgcolor=#d6d6d6
| 421247 ||  || — || March 16, 2005 || Catalina || CSS || — || align=right | 4.0 km || 
|-id=248 bgcolor=#E9E9E9
| 421248 ||  || — || December 25, 2005 || Kitt Peak || Spacewatch || — || align=right | 1.9 km || 
|-id=249 bgcolor=#E9E9E9
| 421249 ||  || — || November 9, 2009 || Socorro || LINEAR || MAR || align=right | 1.6 km || 
|-id=250 bgcolor=#d6d6d6
| 421250 ||  || — || November 3, 2008 || Mount Lemmon || Mount Lemmon Survey || — || align=right | 3.2 km || 
|-id=251 bgcolor=#d6d6d6
| 421251 ||  || — || March 3, 2005 || Catalina || CSS || — || align=right | 2.8 km || 
|-id=252 bgcolor=#E9E9E9
| 421252 ||  || — || March 10, 2007 || Kitt Peak || Spacewatch || — || align=right | 1.1 km || 
|-id=253 bgcolor=#E9E9E9
| 421253 ||  || — || August 15, 2004 || Campo Imperatore || CINEOS || — || align=right | 2.5 km || 
|-id=254 bgcolor=#d6d6d6
| 421254 ||  || — || September 6, 2008 || Kitt Peak || Spacewatch || — || align=right | 2.3 km || 
|-id=255 bgcolor=#d6d6d6
| 421255 ||  || — || October 5, 2002 || Apache Point || SDSS || — || align=right | 2.9 km || 
|-id=256 bgcolor=#d6d6d6
| 421256 ||  || — || April 18, 2007 || Kitt Peak || Spacewatch || — || align=right | 3.6 km || 
|-id=257 bgcolor=#d6d6d6
| 421257 ||  || — || April 20, 2007 || Kitt Peak || Spacewatch || 615 || align=right | 1.5 km || 
|-id=258 bgcolor=#E9E9E9
| 421258 ||  || — || January 31, 2006 || Kitt Peak || Spacewatch || — || align=right | 2.0 km || 
|-id=259 bgcolor=#E9E9E9
| 421259 ||  || — || April 5, 2008 || Mount Lemmon || Mount Lemmon Survey || — || align=right | 1.1 km || 
|-id=260 bgcolor=#E9E9E9
| 421260 ||  || — || September 7, 2004 || Kitt Peak || Spacewatch || — || align=right | 1.7 km || 
|-id=261 bgcolor=#d6d6d6
| 421261 ||  || — || February 15, 2010 || Mount Lemmon || Mount Lemmon Survey || — || align=right | 3.0 km || 
|-id=262 bgcolor=#d6d6d6
| 421262 ||  || — || September 23, 2008 || Kitt Peak || Spacewatch || — || align=right | 3.2 km || 
|-id=263 bgcolor=#d6d6d6
| 421263 ||  || — || October 8, 2008 || Mount Lemmon || Mount Lemmon Survey || — || align=right | 3.1 km || 
|-id=264 bgcolor=#d6d6d6
| 421264 ||  || — || November 8, 2008 || Mount Lemmon || Mount Lemmon Survey || — || align=right | 2.1 km || 
|-id=265 bgcolor=#E9E9E9
| 421265 ||  || — || October 8, 2004 || Kitt Peak || Spacewatch || AST || align=right | 1.8 km || 
|-id=266 bgcolor=#d6d6d6
| 421266 ||  || — || October 28, 2008 || Kitt Peak || Spacewatch || — || align=right | 3.0 km || 
|-id=267 bgcolor=#E9E9E9
| 421267 ||  || — || September 20, 2009 || Kitt Peak || Spacewatch || — || align=right | 2.6 km || 
|-id=268 bgcolor=#E9E9E9
| 421268 ||  || — || March 10, 2007 || Kitt Peak || Spacewatch || — || align=right | 1.7 km || 
|-id=269 bgcolor=#E9E9E9
| 421269 ||  || — || January 30, 2006 || Kitt Peak || Spacewatch || — || align=right | 2.8 km || 
|-id=270 bgcolor=#E9E9E9
| 421270 ||  || — || March 10, 2002 || Kitt Peak || Spacewatch || AST || align=right | 2.1 km || 
|-id=271 bgcolor=#d6d6d6
| 421271 ||  || — || March 6, 2011 || Mount Lemmon || Mount Lemmon Survey || KOR || align=right | 1.7 km || 
|-id=272 bgcolor=#E9E9E9
| 421272 ||  || — || June 9, 2007 || Kitt Peak || Spacewatch || — || align=right | 2.9 km || 
|-id=273 bgcolor=#E9E9E9
| 421273 ||  || — || December 30, 2005 || Mount Lemmon || Mount Lemmon Survey || — || align=right | 2.2 km || 
|-id=274 bgcolor=#d6d6d6
| 421274 ||  || — || August 17, 2002 || Palomar || NEAT || — || align=right | 3.3 km || 
|-id=275 bgcolor=#fefefe
| 421275 ||  || — || November 26, 2006 || Kitt Peak || Spacewatch || — || align=right | 1.0 km || 
|-id=276 bgcolor=#d6d6d6
| 421276 ||  || — || December 20, 2009 || Kitt Peak || Spacewatch || — || align=right | 4.1 km || 
|-id=277 bgcolor=#E9E9E9
| 421277 ||  || — || December 8, 2005 || Kitt Peak || Spacewatch || EUN || align=right | 1.5 km || 
|-id=278 bgcolor=#E9E9E9
| 421278 ||  || — || October 10, 2004 || Kitt Peak || Spacewatch || — || align=right | 2.1 km || 
|-id=279 bgcolor=#E9E9E9
| 421279 ||  || — || October 23, 2004 || Kitt Peak || Spacewatch || AGN || align=right | 1.4 km || 
|-id=280 bgcolor=#E9E9E9
| 421280 ||  || — || September 7, 2004 || Kitt Peak || Spacewatch || — || align=right | 2.5 km || 
|-id=281 bgcolor=#d6d6d6
| 421281 ||  || — || October 3, 2002 || Palomar || NEAT || EOS || align=right | 3.1 km || 
|-id=282 bgcolor=#C2FFFF
| 421282 ||  || — || March 31, 2008 || Mount Lemmon || Mount Lemmon Survey || L5 || align=right | 13 km || 
|-id=283 bgcolor=#E9E9E9
| 421283 ||  || — || December 20, 2001 || Kitt Peak || Spacewatch || — || align=right | 3.8 km || 
|-id=284 bgcolor=#d6d6d6
| 421284 ||  || — || January 6, 2010 || Mount Lemmon || Mount Lemmon Survey || — || align=right | 3.5 km || 
|-id=285 bgcolor=#E9E9E9
| 421285 ||  || — || February 20, 2002 || Kitt Peak || Spacewatch || — || align=right | 2.1 km || 
|-id=286 bgcolor=#d6d6d6
| 421286 ||  || — || October 23, 2008 || Kitt Peak || Spacewatch || — || align=right | 3.6 km || 
|-id=287 bgcolor=#d6d6d6
| 421287 ||  || — || April 11, 2005 || Mount Lemmon || Mount Lemmon Survey || — || align=right | 3.5 km || 
|-id=288 bgcolor=#d6d6d6
| 421288 ||  || — || November 19, 2003 || Kitt Peak || Spacewatch || EOS || align=right | 2.3 km || 
|-id=289 bgcolor=#E9E9E9
| 421289 ||  || — || March 13, 1999 || Kitt Peak || Spacewatch || — || align=right | 1.2 km || 
|-id=290 bgcolor=#E9E9E9
| 421290 ||  || — || March 10, 2007 || Kitt Peak || Spacewatch || — || align=right | 2.0 km || 
|-id=291 bgcolor=#E9E9E9
| 421291 ||  || — || November 4, 2004 || Catalina || CSS || — || align=right | 3.0 km || 
|-id=292 bgcolor=#d6d6d6
| 421292 ||  || — || May 24, 2006 || Kitt Peak || Spacewatch || — || align=right | 3.4 km || 
|-id=293 bgcolor=#d6d6d6
| 421293 ||  || — || October 4, 2002 || Apache Point || SDSS || — || align=right | 3.5 km || 
|-id=294 bgcolor=#fefefe
| 421294 ||  || — || November 10, 2006 || Kitt Peak || Spacewatch || — || align=right | 1.1 km || 
|-id=295 bgcolor=#E9E9E9
| 421295 ||  || — || February 8, 2002 || Kitt Peak || Spacewatch || — || align=right | 1.8 km || 
|-id=296 bgcolor=#E9E9E9
| 421296 ||  || — || March 13, 2007 || Mount Lemmon || Mount Lemmon Survey || — || align=right | 1.8 km || 
|-id=297 bgcolor=#d6d6d6
| 421297 ||  || — || February 13, 2004 || Kitt Peak || Spacewatch || — || align=right | 4.4 km || 
|-id=298 bgcolor=#fefefe
| 421298 ||  || — || February 7, 2008 || Mount Lemmon || Mount Lemmon Survey || — || align=right data-sort-value="0.90" | 900 m || 
|-id=299 bgcolor=#d6d6d6
| 421299 ||  || — || January 19, 2004 || Kitt Peak || Spacewatch || — || align=right | 3.1 km || 
|-id=300 bgcolor=#d6d6d6
| 421300 ||  || — || September 29, 2008 || Mount Lemmon || Mount Lemmon Survey || — || align=right | 2.6 km || 
|}

421301–421400 

|-bgcolor=#d6d6d6
| 421301 ||  || — || November 12, 1999 || Kitt Peak || Spacewatch || KOR || align=right | 1.2 km || 
|-id=302 bgcolor=#d6d6d6
| 421302 ||  || — || November 3, 2008 || Kitt Peak || Spacewatch || EOS || align=right | 2.3 km || 
|-id=303 bgcolor=#d6d6d6
| 421303 ||  || — || March 25, 2006 || Palomar || NEAT || — || align=right | 4.3 km || 
|-id=304 bgcolor=#d6d6d6
| 421304 ||  || — || August 23, 2003 || Palomar || NEAT || — || align=right | 2.7 km || 
|-id=305 bgcolor=#d6d6d6
| 421305 ||  || — || February 17, 2010 || Kitt Peak || Spacewatch || THM || align=right | 2.6 km || 
|-id=306 bgcolor=#E9E9E9
| 421306 ||  || — || April 23, 2007 || Kitt Peak || Spacewatch || GEF || align=right | 1.6 km || 
|-id=307 bgcolor=#d6d6d6
| 421307 ||  || — || March 19, 2001 || Kitt Peak || Spacewatch || — || align=right | 3.1 km || 
|-id=308 bgcolor=#d6d6d6
| 421308 ||  || — || March 10, 2005 || Mount Lemmon || Mount Lemmon Survey || — || align=right | 2.8 km || 
|-id=309 bgcolor=#d6d6d6
| 421309 ||  || — || October 2, 2013 || Mount Lemmon || Mount Lemmon Survey || VER || align=right | 3.3 km || 
|-id=310 bgcolor=#E9E9E9
| 421310 ||  || — || September 23, 2009 || Mount Lemmon || Mount Lemmon Survey || — || align=right | 1.1 km || 
|-id=311 bgcolor=#E9E9E9
| 421311 ||  || — || April 22, 2007 || Kitt Peak || Spacewatch || — || align=right | 2.3 km || 
|-id=312 bgcolor=#C2FFFF
| 421312 ||  || — || September 13, 2013 || Mount Lemmon || Mount Lemmon Survey || L5 || align=right | 7.5 km || 
|-id=313 bgcolor=#d6d6d6
| 421313 ||  || — || October 28, 1997 || Kitt Peak || Spacewatch || — || align=right | 3.1 km || 
|-id=314 bgcolor=#d6d6d6
| 421314 ||  || — || October 21, 2007 || Mount Lemmon || Mount Lemmon Survey || — || align=right | 3.3 km || 
|-id=315 bgcolor=#d6d6d6
| 421315 ||  || — || August 25, 2005 || Palomar || NEAT || SHU3:2 || align=right | 6.0 km || 
|-id=316 bgcolor=#C2FFFF
| 421316 ||  || — || September 5, 2000 || Apache Point || SDSS || L5 || align=right | 10 km || 
|-id=317 bgcolor=#d6d6d6
| 421317 ||  || — || September 23, 2008 || Kitt Peak || Spacewatch || — || align=right | 2.5 km || 
|-id=318 bgcolor=#E9E9E9
| 421318 ||  || — || October 14, 2009 || Catalina || CSS || — || align=right | 2.3 km || 
|-id=319 bgcolor=#E9E9E9
| 421319 ||  || — || February 5, 2006 || Mount Lemmon || Mount Lemmon Survey || — || align=right | 2.1 km || 
|-id=320 bgcolor=#d6d6d6
| 421320 ||  || — || October 4, 1997 || Kitt Peak || Spacewatch || — || align=right | 3.1 km || 
|-id=321 bgcolor=#E9E9E9
| 421321 ||  || — || July 19, 2004 || Anderson Mesa || LONEOS || — || align=right | 1.6 km || 
|-id=322 bgcolor=#d6d6d6
| 421322 ||  || — || October 10, 2008 || Mount Lemmon || Mount Lemmon Survey || EOS || align=right | 1.9 km || 
|-id=323 bgcolor=#d6d6d6
| 421323 ||  || — || March 4, 2005 || Mount Lemmon || Mount Lemmon Survey || — || align=right | 2.9 km || 
|-id=324 bgcolor=#d6d6d6
| 421324 ||  || — || February 10, 2011 || Catalina || CSS || EOS || align=right | 2.4 km || 
|-id=325 bgcolor=#E9E9E9
| 421325 ||  || — || September 7, 2004 || Socorro || LINEAR || — || align=right | 2.4 km || 
|-id=326 bgcolor=#E9E9E9
| 421326 ||  || — || September 27, 2008 || Mount Lemmon || Mount Lemmon Survey || — || align=right | 3.1 km || 
|-id=327 bgcolor=#fefefe
| 421327 ||  || — || May 14, 2005 || Mount Lemmon || Mount Lemmon Survey || — || align=right | 1.0 km || 
|-id=328 bgcolor=#d6d6d6
| 421328 ||  || — || January 16, 2004 || Kitt Peak || Spacewatch || THM || align=right | 1.9 km || 
|-id=329 bgcolor=#E9E9E9
| 421329 ||  || — || April 20, 2007 || Kitt Peak || Spacewatch || — || align=right | 2.3 km || 
|-id=330 bgcolor=#d6d6d6
| 421330 ||  || — || February 12, 2000 || Apache Point || SDSS || — || align=right | 3.4 km || 
|-id=331 bgcolor=#d6d6d6
| 421331 ||  || — || May 3, 2006 || Mount Lemmon || Mount Lemmon Survey || — || align=right | 2.8 km || 
|-id=332 bgcolor=#fefefe
| 421332 ||  || — || March 13, 2005 || Catalina || CSS || — || align=right | 1.00 km || 
|-id=333 bgcolor=#E9E9E9
| 421333 ||  || — || April 7, 2006 || Mount Lemmon || Mount Lemmon Survey || — || align=right | 2.6 km || 
|-id=334 bgcolor=#d6d6d6
| 421334 ||  || — || December 12, 2004 || Kitt Peak || Spacewatch || KOR || align=right | 1.5 km || 
|-id=335 bgcolor=#d6d6d6
| 421335 ||  || — || August 28, 2001 || Kitt Peak || Spacewatch || — || align=right | 3.6 km || 
|-id=336 bgcolor=#d6d6d6
| 421336 ||  || — || September 11, 2007 || Mount Lemmon || Mount Lemmon Survey || (8737) || align=right | 3.7 km || 
|-id=337 bgcolor=#d6d6d6
| 421337 ||  || — || August 12, 2002 || Socorro || LINEAR || — || align=right | 4.9 km || 
|-id=338 bgcolor=#C2FFFF
| 421338 ||  || — || September 17, 2001 || Kitt Peak || Spacewatch || L5 || align=right | 8.2 km || 
|-id=339 bgcolor=#E9E9E9
| 421339 ||  || — || January 4, 2006 || Kitt Peak || Spacewatch || — || align=right | 2.5 km || 
|-id=340 bgcolor=#d6d6d6
| 421340 ||  || — || March 21, 1999 || Apache Point || SDSS || — || align=right | 3.4 km || 
|-id=341 bgcolor=#E9E9E9
| 421341 ||  || — || April 10, 2002 || Socorro || LINEAR || — || align=right | 3.1 km || 
|-id=342 bgcolor=#d6d6d6
| 421342 ||  || — || July 19, 2007 || Mount Lemmon || Mount Lemmon Survey || — || align=right | 2.7 km || 
|-id=343 bgcolor=#E9E9E9
| 421343 ||  || — || October 12, 1996 || Kitt Peak || Spacewatch || — || align=right | 2.3 km || 
|-id=344 bgcolor=#d6d6d6
| 421344 ||  || — || December 3, 2008 || Kitt Peak || Spacewatch || — || align=right | 3.6 km || 
|-id=345 bgcolor=#d6d6d6
| 421345 ||  || — || March 4, 2005 || Mount Lemmon || Mount Lemmon Survey || — || align=right | 2.9 km || 
|-id=346 bgcolor=#d6d6d6
| 421346 ||  || — || October 10, 2008 || Mount Lemmon || Mount Lemmon Survey || — || align=right | 3.1 km || 
|-id=347 bgcolor=#E9E9E9
| 421347 ||  || — || April 11, 1994 || Kitt Peak || Spacewatch || — || align=right | 1.8 km || 
|-id=348 bgcolor=#d6d6d6
| 421348 ||  || — || January 30, 2006 || Kitt Peak || Spacewatch || KOR || align=right | 1.6 km || 
|-id=349 bgcolor=#E9E9E9
| 421349 ||  || — || September 9, 2004 || Kitt Peak || Spacewatch || GEF || align=right | 1.3 km || 
|-id=350 bgcolor=#E9E9E9
| 421350 ||  || — || February 9, 2002 || Kitt Peak || Spacewatch || — || align=right | 2.5 km || 
|-id=351 bgcolor=#d6d6d6
| 421351 ||  || — || September 27, 2002 || Palomar || NEAT || — || align=right | 3.1 km || 
|-id=352 bgcolor=#d6d6d6
| 421352 ||  || — || October 5, 1996 || Kitt Peak || Spacewatch || — || align=right | 3.1 km || 
|-id=353 bgcolor=#d6d6d6
| 421353 ||  || — || September 18, 2003 || Kitt Peak || Spacewatch || NAE || align=right | 2.2 km || 
|-id=354 bgcolor=#E9E9E9
| 421354 ||  || — || October 5, 2004 || Kitt Peak || Spacewatch || — || align=right | 2.3 km || 
|-id=355 bgcolor=#d6d6d6
| 421355 ||  || — || October 24, 2008 || Kitt Peak || Spacewatch || — || align=right | 2.9 km || 
|-id=356 bgcolor=#d6d6d6
| 421356 ||  || — || November 3, 2007 || Catalina || CSS || 7:4 || align=right | 3.6 km || 
|-id=357 bgcolor=#d6d6d6
| 421357 ||  || — || November 14, 2002 || Palomar || NEAT || TIR || align=right | 4.0 km || 
|-id=358 bgcolor=#d6d6d6
| 421358 ||  || — || May 13, 2010 || WISE || WISE || — || align=right | 3.7 km || 
|-id=359 bgcolor=#d6d6d6
| 421359 ||  || — || October 20, 2008 || Kitt Peak || Spacewatch || — || align=right | 3.5 km || 
|-id=360 bgcolor=#d6d6d6
| 421360 ||  || — || November 2, 2008 || Mount Lemmon || Mount Lemmon Survey || — || align=right | 3.5 km || 
|-id=361 bgcolor=#d6d6d6
| 421361 ||  || — || February 17, 2004 || Catalina || CSS || EOS || align=right | 2.7 km || 
|-id=362 bgcolor=#E9E9E9
| 421362 ||  || — || November 3, 2004 || Kitt Peak || Spacewatch || — || align=right | 2.7 km || 
|-id=363 bgcolor=#E9E9E9
| 421363 ||  || — || July 8, 2003 || Campo Imperatore || CINEOS || — || align=right | 3.1 km || 
|-id=364 bgcolor=#E9E9E9
| 421364 ||  || — || August 23, 2004 || Kitt Peak || Spacewatch || — || align=right | 2.0 km || 
|-id=365 bgcolor=#C2FFFF
| 421365 ||  || — || February 25, 2006 || Oukaïmeden || Spacewatch || L5 || align=right | 8.5 km || 
|-id=366 bgcolor=#d6d6d6
| 421366 ||  || — || April 19, 2006 || Kitt Peak || Spacewatch || — || align=right | 3.4 km || 
|-id=367 bgcolor=#E9E9E9
| 421367 ||  || — || October 23, 2009 || Mount Lemmon || Mount Lemmon Survey || EUN || align=right | 1.9 km || 
|-id=368 bgcolor=#E9E9E9
| 421368 ||  || — || October 27, 2005 || Mount Lemmon || Mount Lemmon Survey || — || align=right | 2.5 km || 
|-id=369 bgcolor=#d6d6d6
| 421369 ||  || — || September 11, 2007 || XuYi || PMO NEO || — || align=right | 3.4 km || 
|-id=370 bgcolor=#d6d6d6
| 421370 ||  || — || October 26, 2008 || Kitt Peak || Spacewatch || — || align=right | 3.5 km || 
|-id=371 bgcolor=#d6d6d6
| 421371 ||  || — || June 8, 2005 || Kitt Peak || Spacewatch || — || align=right | 5.0 km || 
|-id=372 bgcolor=#d6d6d6
| 421372 ||  || — || May 7, 2006 || Mount Lemmon || Mount Lemmon Survey || — || align=right | 3.6 km || 
|-id=373 bgcolor=#d6d6d6
| 421373 ||  || — || October 30, 2008 || Kitt Peak || Spacewatch || — || align=right | 3.1 km || 
|-id=374 bgcolor=#E9E9E9
| 421374 ||  || — || May 25, 2007 || Mount Lemmon || Mount Lemmon Survey || — || align=right | 2.6 km || 
|-id=375 bgcolor=#d6d6d6
| 421375 ||  || — || August 14, 2001 || Haleakala || NEAT || — || align=right | 3.5 km || 
|-id=376 bgcolor=#fefefe
| 421376 ||  || — || May 5, 2008 || Mount Lemmon || Mount Lemmon Survey || V || align=right data-sort-value="0.88" | 880 m || 
|-id=377 bgcolor=#d6d6d6
| 421377 ||  || — || September 20, 2003 || Palomar || NEAT || NAE || align=right | 2.5 km || 
|-id=378 bgcolor=#d6d6d6
| 421378 ||  || — || September 10, 2007 || Catalina || CSS || EOS || align=right | 2.2 km || 
|-id=379 bgcolor=#d6d6d6
| 421379 ||  || — || September 14, 2002 || Haleakala || NEAT || — || align=right | 3.5 km || 
|-id=380 bgcolor=#d6d6d6
| 421380 ||  || — || November 17, 2008 || Kitt Peak || Spacewatch || — || align=right | 3.4 km || 
|-id=381 bgcolor=#d6d6d6
| 421381 ||  || — || December 30, 2005 || Kitt Peak || Spacewatch || — || align=right | 2.0 km || 
|-id=382 bgcolor=#C2FFFF
| 421382 ||  || — || April 6, 2008 || Mount Lemmon || Mount Lemmon Survey || L5 || align=right | 13 km || 
|-id=383 bgcolor=#E9E9E9
| 421383 ||  || — || September 11, 2004 || Palomar || NEAT || — || align=right | 2.0 km || 
|-id=384 bgcolor=#E9E9E9
| 421384 ||  || — || August 24, 2008 || Kitt Peak || Spacewatch || — || align=right | 2.5 km || 
|-id=385 bgcolor=#d6d6d6
| 421385 ||  || — || September 12, 2002 || Palomar || NEAT || — || align=right | 4.1 km || 
|-id=386 bgcolor=#E9E9E9
| 421386 ||  || — || January 23, 2006 || Kitt Peak || Spacewatch || — || align=right | 2.9 km || 
|-id=387 bgcolor=#d6d6d6
| 421387 ||  || — || October 10, 2007 || Catalina || CSS || — || align=right | 4.2 km || 
|-id=388 bgcolor=#d6d6d6
| 421388 ||  || — || September 11, 2007 || XuYi || PMO NEO || — || align=right | 3.7 km || 
|-id=389 bgcolor=#E9E9E9
| 421389 ||  || — || August 23, 2008 || Siding Spring || SSS || — || align=right | 3.7 km || 
|-id=390 bgcolor=#E9E9E9
| 421390 ||  || — || October 8, 2004 || Kitt Peak || Spacewatch || — || align=right | 2.9 km || 
|-id=391 bgcolor=#E9E9E9
| 421391 ||  || — || December 1, 2004 || Catalina || CSS || — || align=right | 3.5 km || 
|-id=392 bgcolor=#E9E9E9
| 421392 ||  || — || November 17, 2004 || Campo Imperatore || CINEOS || — || align=right | 2.7 km || 
|-id=393 bgcolor=#C2FFFF
| 421393 ||  || — || January 19, 2005 || Kitt Peak || Spacewatch || L5 || align=right | 10 km || 
|-id=394 bgcolor=#d6d6d6
| 421394 ||  || — || April 14, 2005 || Kitt Peak || Spacewatch || — || align=right | 4.2 km || 
|-id=395 bgcolor=#E9E9E9
| 421395 ||  || — || September 7, 2004 || Kitt Peak || Spacewatch || — || align=right | 2.0 km || 
|-id=396 bgcolor=#d6d6d6
| 421396 ||  || — || January 15, 2009 || XuYi || PMO NEO || — || align=right | 4.3 km || 
|-id=397 bgcolor=#d6d6d6
| 421397 ||  || — || March 9, 2005 || Mount Lemmon || Mount Lemmon Survey || — || align=right | 4.0 km || 
|-id=398 bgcolor=#d6d6d6
| 421398 ||  || — || January 28, 2006 || Mount Lemmon || Mount Lemmon Survey || — || align=right | 3.2 km || 
|-id=399 bgcolor=#d6d6d6
| 421399 ||  || — || April 10, 2005 || Kitt Peak || Spacewatch || — || align=right | 3.8 km || 
|-id=400 bgcolor=#C2FFFF
| 421400 ||  || — || March 12, 2007 || Mount Lemmon || Mount Lemmon Survey || L5 || align=right | 12 km || 
|}

421401–421500 

|-bgcolor=#d6d6d6
| 421401 ||  || — || January 22, 1998 || Kitt Peak || Spacewatch || — || align=right | 4.1 km || 
|-id=402 bgcolor=#d6d6d6
| 421402 ||  || — || October 14, 2007 || Mount Lemmon || Mount Lemmon Survey || — || align=right | 3.0 km || 
|-id=403 bgcolor=#d6d6d6
| 421403 ||  || — || November 3, 1991 || Kitt Peak || Spacewatch || EOS || align=right | 3.0 km || 
|-id=404 bgcolor=#E9E9E9
| 421404 ||  || — || May 29, 2008 || Mount Lemmon || Mount Lemmon Survey || — || align=right | 2.7 km || 
|-id=405 bgcolor=#d6d6d6
| 421405 ||  || — || October 8, 2007 || Catalina || CSS || VER || align=right | 3.6 km || 
|-id=406 bgcolor=#d6d6d6
| 421406 ||  || — || April 6, 2005 || Kitt Peak || Spacewatch || — || align=right | 3.7 km || 
|-id=407 bgcolor=#d6d6d6
| 421407 ||  || — || October 15, 2007 || Anderson Mesa || LONEOS || — || align=right | 5.9 km || 
|-id=408 bgcolor=#E9E9E9
| 421408 ||  || — || July 1, 1998 || Kitt Peak || Spacewatch || GEF || align=right | 1.9 km || 
|-id=409 bgcolor=#E9E9E9
| 421409 ||  || — || September 11, 2004 || Socorro || LINEAR || ADE || align=right | 3.0 km || 
|-id=410 bgcolor=#d6d6d6
| 421410 ||  || — || January 16, 2004 || Palomar || NEAT || — || align=right | 4.2 km || 
|-id=411 bgcolor=#d6d6d6
| 421411 ||  || — || November 19, 2008 || Mount Lemmon || Mount Lemmon Survey || — || align=right | 3.1 km || 
|-id=412 bgcolor=#d6d6d6
| 421412 ||  || — || October 10, 2007 || Catalina || CSS || — || align=right | 3.9 km || 
|-id=413 bgcolor=#d6d6d6
| 421413 ||  || — || October 10, 2007 || Catalina || CSS || EOS || align=right | 2.6 km || 
|-id=414 bgcolor=#d6d6d6
| 421414 ||  || — || January 17, 2007 || Catalina || CSS || 3:2 || align=right | 5.6 km || 
|-id=415 bgcolor=#d6d6d6
| 421415 ||  || — || December 28, 2003 || Socorro || LINEAR || — || align=right | 4.2 km || 
|-id=416 bgcolor=#d6d6d6
| 421416 ||  || — || March 17, 2005 || Mount Lemmon || Mount Lemmon Survey || EOS || align=right | 2.2 km || 
|-id=417 bgcolor=#d6d6d6
| 421417 ||  || — || October 15, 2007 || Mount Lemmon || Mount Lemmon Survey || — || align=right | 3.3 km || 
|-id=418 bgcolor=#d6d6d6
| 421418 ||  || — || June 1, 2010 || WISE || WISE || — || align=right | 6.2 km || 
|-id=419 bgcolor=#d6d6d6
| 421419 ||  || — || October 2, 1997 || Caussols || ODAS || — || align=right | 5.3 km || 
|-id=420 bgcolor=#d6d6d6
| 421420 ||  || — || February 14, 2004 || Kitt Peak || Spacewatch || — || align=right | 6.2 km || 
|-id=421 bgcolor=#d6d6d6
| 421421 ||  || — || March 18, 2005 || Catalina || CSS || EOS || align=right | 3.0 km || 
|-id=422 bgcolor=#E9E9E9
| 421422 ||  || — || January 2, 2006 || Socorro || LINEAR || — || align=right | 1.7 km || 
|-id=423 bgcolor=#d6d6d6
| 421423 ||  || — || November 2, 2007 || Kitt Peak || Spacewatch || VER || align=right | 3.4 km || 
|-id=424 bgcolor=#d6d6d6
| 421424 ||  || — || August 9, 2000 || Kitt Peak || Spacewatch || — || align=right | 4.0 km || 
|-id=425 bgcolor=#d6d6d6
| 421425 ||  || — || September 14, 2007 || Catalina || CSS || — || align=right | 3.9 km || 
|-id=426 bgcolor=#d6d6d6
| 421426 ||  || — || November 20, 2008 || Kitt Peak || Spacewatch || EOS || align=right | 2.1 km || 
|-id=427 bgcolor=#E9E9E9
| 421427 ||  || — || January 23, 2006 || Kitt Peak || Spacewatch || — || align=right | 3.1 km || 
|-id=428 bgcolor=#E9E9E9
| 421428 ||  || — || March 4, 2006 || Mount Lemmon || Mount Lemmon Survey || — || align=right | 1.1 km || 
|-id=429 bgcolor=#E9E9E9
| 421429 ||  || — || September 28, 2003 || Kitt Peak || Spacewatch || ADE || align=right | 3.9 km || 
|-id=430 bgcolor=#d6d6d6
| 421430 ||  || — || May 11, 2010 || Mount Lemmon || Mount Lemmon Survey || — || align=right | 4.3 km || 
|-id=431 bgcolor=#E9E9E9
| 421431 ||  || — || February 27, 2001 || Cima Ekar || ADAS || JUN || align=right | 1.2 km || 
|-id=432 bgcolor=#E9E9E9
| 421432 ||  || — || November 30, 2003 || Kitt Peak || Spacewatch || — || align=right | 2.1 km || 
|-id=433 bgcolor=#d6d6d6
| 421433 ||  || — || January 13, 2008 || Mount Lemmon || Mount Lemmon Survey || — || align=right | 5.4 km || 
|-id=434 bgcolor=#C2FFFF
| 421434 ||  || — || September 16, 2009 || Kitt Peak || Spacewatch || L4 || align=right | 8.0 km || 
|-id=435 bgcolor=#fefefe
| 421435 ||  || — || September 11, 2004 || Kitt Peak || Spacewatch || — || align=right data-sort-value="0.97" | 970 m || 
|-id=436 bgcolor=#fefefe
| 421436 ||  || — || March 6, 2003 || Anderson Mesa || LONEOS || — || align=right | 2.8 km || 
|-id=437 bgcolor=#E9E9E9
| 421437 ||  || — || September 30, 2003 || Kitt Peak || Spacewatch || — || align=right | 1.4 km || 
|-id=438 bgcolor=#E9E9E9
| 421438 ||  || — || January 24, 2004 || Socorro || LINEAR || — || align=right | 3.3 km || 
|-id=439 bgcolor=#E9E9E9
| 421439 ||  || — || December 16, 1995 || Kitt Peak || Spacewatch || — || align=right | 1.5 km || 
|-id=440 bgcolor=#fefefe
| 421440 ||  || — || October 8, 2008 || Mount Lemmon || Mount Lemmon Survey || — || align=right data-sort-value="0.78" | 780 m || 
|-id=441 bgcolor=#fefefe
| 421441 ||  || — || October 8, 2007 || Catalina || CSS || — || align=right | 1.1 km || 
|-id=442 bgcolor=#fefefe
| 421442 ||  || — || November 17, 2011 || Mount Lemmon || Mount Lemmon Survey || — || align=right data-sort-value="0.77" | 770 m || 
|-id=443 bgcolor=#fefefe
| 421443 ||  || — || September 14, 2004 || Anderson Mesa || LONEOS || — || align=right data-sort-value="0.78" | 780 m || 
|-id=444 bgcolor=#fefefe
| 421444 ||  || — || April 25, 2003 || Kitt Peak || Spacewatch || MAS || align=right data-sort-value="0.58" | 580 m || 
|-id=445 bgcolor=#d6d6d6
| 421445 ||  || — || September 22, 2003 || Kitt Peak || Spacewatch || EOS || align=right | 3.0 km || 
|-id=446 bgcolor=#fefefe
| 421446 ||  || — || January 23, 2006 || Kitt Peak || Spacewatch || — || align=right data-sort-value="0.94" | 940 m || 
|-id=447 bgcolor=#E9E9E9
| 421447 ||  || — || July 28, 2005 || Palomar || NEAT || — || align=right | 1.8 km || 
|-id=448 bgcolor=#E9E9E9
| 421448 ||  || — || March 8, 2003 || Kitt Peak || Spacewatch || — || align=right | 2.5 km || 
|-id=449 bgcolor=#d6d6d6
| 421449 ||  || — || October 16, 2009 || Catalina || CSS || EOS || align=right | 2.5 km || 
|-id=450 bgcolor=#FA8072
| 421450 ||  || — || December 21, 2005 || Kitt Peak || Spacewatch || — || align=right data-sort-value="0.98" | 980 m || 
|-id=451 bgcolor=#E9E9E9
| 421451 ||  || — || January 11, 2008 || Kitt Peak || Spacewatch || — || align=right | 2.6 km || 
|-id=452 bgcolor=#d6d6d6
| 421452 ||  || — || January 18, 2012 || Kitt Peak || Spacewatch || — || align=right | 4.1 km || 
|-id=453 bgcolor=#E9E9E9
| 421453 ||  || — || April 13, 2004 || Palomar || NEAT || — || align=right | 3.2 km || 
|-id=454 bgcolor=#d6d6d6
| 421454 ||  || — || December 13, 2006 || Mount Lemmon || Mount Lemmon Survey || — || align=right | 2.8 km || 
|-id=455 bgcolor=#d6d6d6
| 421455 ||  || — || October 4, 2005 || Mount Lemmon || Mount Lemmon Survey || KOR || align=right | 1.4 km || 
|-id=456 bgcolor=#d6d6d6
| 421456 ||  || — || September 10, 2004 || Socorro || LINEAR || — || align=right | 2.7 km || 
|-id=457 bgcolor=#E9E9E9
| 421457 ||  || — || October 19, 1998 || Caussols || ODAS || — || align=right | 2.7 km || 
|-id=458 bgcolor=#fefefe
| 421458 ||  || — || December 12, 2004 || Kitt Peak || Spacewatch || — || align=right data-sort-value="0.89" | 890 m || 
|-id=459 bgcolor=#d6d6d6
| 421459 ||  || — || April 16, 2007 || Catalina || CSS || — || align=right | 3.4 km || 
|-id=460 bgcolor=#E9E9E9
| 421460 ||  || — || October 13, 2010 || Mount Lemmon || Mount Lemmon Survey || — || align=right | 1.8 km || 
|-id=461 bgcolor=#fefefe
| 421461 ||  || — || April 15, 2010 || Mount Lemmon || Mount Lemmon Survey || NYS || align=right data-sort-value="0.66" | 660 m || 
|-id=462 bgcolor=#E9E9E9
| 421462 ||  || — || September 29, 2001 || Palomar || NEAT || — || align=right | 1.4 km || 
|-id=463 bgcolor=#fefefe
| 421463 ||  || — || November 30, 2003 || Kitt Peak || Spacewatch || NYS || align=right data-sort-value="0.68" | 680 m || 
|-id=464 bgcolor=#fefefe
| 421464 ||  || — || October 7, 2004 || Anderson Mesa || LONEOS || — || align=right data-sort-value="0.79" | 790 m || 
|-id=465 bgcolor=#fefefe
| 421465 ||  || — || September 16, 2003 || Kitt Peak || Spacewatch || (5026) || align=right data-sort-value="0.85" | 850 m || 
|-id=466 bgcolor=#fefefe
| 421466 ||  || — || August 11, 2007 || Anderson Mesa || LONEOS || — || align=right data-sort-value="0.82" | 820 m || 
|-id=467 bgcolor=#E9E9E9
| 421467 ||  || — || September 15, 2010 || Mount Lemmon || Mount Lemmon Survey || — || align=right | 1.5 km || 
|-id=468 bgcolor=#fefefe
| 421468 ||  || — || April 20, 2010 || Kitt Peak || Spacewatch || — || align=right | 2.3 km || 
|-id=469 bgcolor=#E9E9E9
| 421469 ||  || — || January 1, 2008 || Kitt Peak || Spacewatch || — || align=right | 1.9 km || 
|-id=470 bgcolor=#d6d6d6
| 421470 ||  || — || September 7, 2004 || Kitt Peak || Spacewatch || — || align=right | 2.3 km || 
|-id=471 bgcolor=#E9E9E9
| 421471 ||  || — || December 18, 2007 || Mount Lemmon || Mount Lemmon Survey || — || align=right | 3.0 km || 
|-id=472 bgcolor=#E9E9E9
| 421472 ||  || — || September 2, 2010 || Mount Lemmon || Mount Lemmon Survey || — || align=right | 1.3 km || 
|-id=473 bgcolor=#d6d6d6
| 421473 ||  || — || December 8, 2010 || Mount Lemmon || Mount Lemmon Survey || — || align=right | 3.1 km || 
|-id=474 bgcolor=#E9E9E9
| 421474 ||  || — || November 1, 2006 || Mount Lemmon || Mount Lemmon Survey || — || align=right | 1.3 km || 
|-id=475 bgcolor=#fefefe
| 421475 ||  || — || January 28, 2006 || Kitt Peak || Spacewatch || — || align=right data-sort-value="0.74" | 740 m || 
|-id=476 bgcolor=#d6d6d6
| 421476 ||  || — || May 14, 2008 || Mount Lemmon || Mount Lemmon Survey || — || align=right | 2.8 km || 
|-id=477 bgcolor=#fefefe
| 421477 ||  || — || January 8, 2006 || Mount Lemmon || Mount Lemmon Survey || — || align=right data-sort-value="0.74" | 740 m || 
|-id=478 bgcolor=#fefefe
| 421478 ||  || — || September 12, 2007 || Kitt Peak || Spacewatch || — || align=right data-sort-value="0.80" | 800 m || 
|-id=479 bgcolor=#E9E9E9
| 421479 ||  || — || December 29, 2003 || Kitt Peak || Spacewatch || — || align=right | 1.7 km || 
|-id=480 bgcolor=#fefefe
| 421480 ||  || — || September 10, 2007 || Kitt Peak || Spacewatch || NYS || align=right data-sort-value="0.70" | 700 m || 
|-id=481 bgcolor=#d6d6d6
| 421481 ||  || — || February 25, 2007 || Kitt Peak || Spacewatch || THM || align=right | 2.4 km || 
|-id=482 bgcolor=#fefefe
| 421482 ||  || — || October 11, 2007 || Mount Lemmon || Mount Lemmon Survey || — || align=right data-sort-value="0.79" | 790 m || 
|-id=483 bgcolor=#fefefe
| 421483 ||  || — || December 18, 2004 || Mount Lemmon || Mount Lemmon Survey || — || align=right data-sort-value="0.74" | 740 m || 
|-id=484 bgcolor=#E9E9E9
| 421484 ||  || — || January 30, 2004 || Kitt Peak || Spacewatch || — || align=right | 1.8 km || 
|-id=485 bgcolor=#d6d6d6
| 421485 ||  || — || March 15, 2007 || Kitt Peak || Spacewatch || — || align=right | 2.6 km || 
|-id=486 bgcolor=#d6d6d6
| 421486 ||  || — || April 25, 2007 || Mount Lemmon || Mount Lemmon Survey || — || align=right | 3.3 km || 
|-id=487 bgcolor=#E9E9E9
| 421487 ||  || — || February 11, 2004 || Palomar || NEAT || — || align=right | 1.3 km || 
|-id=488 bgcolor=#E9E9E9
| 421488 ||  || — || August 30, 2005 || Kitt Peak || Spacewatch || — || align=right | 1.7 km || 
|-id=489 bgcolor=#E9E9E9
| 421489 ||  || — || February 8, 2008 || Kitt Peak || Spacewatch || — || align=right | 1.7 km || 
|-id=490 bgcolor=#d6d6d6
| 421490 ||  || — || December 14, 2010 || Mount Lemmon || Mount Lemmon Survey || — || align=right | 3.5 km || 
|-id=491 bgcolor=#d6d6d6
| 421491 ||  || — || March 16, 2002 || Kitt Peak || Spacewatch || — || align=right | 2.8 km || 
|-id=492 bgcolor=#E9E9E9
| 421492 ||  || — || March 11, 2005 || Kitt Peak || Spacewatch || — || align=right data-sort-value="0.72" | 720 m || 
|-id=493 bgcolor=#E9E9E9
| 421493 ||  || — || December 14, 2006 || Kitt Peak || Spacewatch || — || align=right | 3.4 km || 
|-id=494 bgcolor=#d6d6d6
| 421494 ||  || — || February 1, 2012 || Mount Lemmon || Mount Lemmon Survey || — || align=right | 3.2 km || 
|-id=495 bgcolor=#E9E9E9
| 421495 ||  || — || December 15, 2006 || Kitt Peak || Spacewatch || — || align=right | 2.8 km || 
|-id=496 bgcolor=#d6d6d6
| 421496 ||  || — || January 31, 2006 || Kitt Peak || Spacewatch || — || align=right | 2.5 km || 
|-id=497 bgcolor=#E9E9E9
| 421497 ||  || — || December 18, 2007 || Mount Lemmon || Mount Lemmon Survey || — || align=right data-sort-value="0.93" | 930 m || 
|-id=498 bgcolor=#fefefe
| 421498 ||  || — || April 6, 2002 || Cerro Tololo || M. W. Buie || NYS || align=right data-sort-value="0.72" | 720 m || 
|-id=499 bgcolor=#E9E9E9
| 421499 ||  || — || November 27, 2006 || Kitt Peak || Spacewatch || AGN || align=right | 1.3 km || 
|-id=500 bgcolor=#fefefe
| 421500 ||  || — || November 8, 2007 || Kitt Peak || Spacewatch || — || align=right data-sort-value="0.69" | 690 m || 
|}

421501–421600 

|-bgcolor=#fefefe
| 421501 ||  || — || March 24, 2006 || Mount Lemmon || Mount Lemmon Survey || — || align=right data-sort-value="0.67" | 670 m || 
|-id=502 bgcolor=#d6d6d6
| 421502 ||  || — || April 30, 2008 || Kitt Peak || Spacewatch || — || align=right | 3.4 km || 
|-id=503 bgcolor=#fefefe
| 421503 ||  || — || April 8, 2010 || Mount Lemmon || Mount Lemmon Survey || — || align=right data-sort-value="0.68" | 680 m || 
|-id=504 bgcolor=#fefefe
| 421504 ||  || — || June 19, 2007 || Kitt Peak || Spacewatch || — || align=right data-sort-value="0.69" | 690 m || 
|-id=505 bgcolor=#E9E9E9
| 421505 ||  || — || January 17, 2004 || Kitt Peak || Spacewatch || — || align=right | 1.2 km || 
|-id=506 bgcolor=#d6d6d6
| 421506 ||  || — || January 9, 2006 || Mount Lemmon || Mount Lemmon Survey || EOS || align=right | 2.0 km || 
|-id=507 bgcolor=#fefefe
| 421507 ||  || — || September 26, 2008 || Kitt Peak || Spacewatch || — || align=right data-sort-value="0.62" | 620 m || 
|-id=508 bgcolor=#d6d6d6
| 421508 ||  || — || March 11, 2007 || Kitt Peak || Spacewatch || — || align=right | 2.6 km || 
|-id=509 bgcolor=#fefefe
| 421509 ||  || — || September 15, 2007 || Anderson Mesa || LONEOS || — || align=right data-sort-value="0.60" | 600 m || 
|-id=510 bgcolor=#E9E9E9
| 421510 ||  || — || December 12, 2006 || Mount Lemmon || Mount Lemmon Survey || — || align=right | 2.4 km || 
|-id=511 bgcolor=#d6d6d6
| 421511 ||  || — || February 3, 2001 || Kitt Peak || Spacewatch || — || align=right | 3.9 km || 
|-id=512 bgcolor=#fefefe
| 421512 ||  || — || December 29, 2005 || Kitt Peak || Spacewatch || — || align=right | 1.4 km || 
|-id=513 bgcolor=#fefefe
| 421513 ||  || — || October 15, 2007 || Mount Lemmon || Mount Lemmon Survey || — || align=right data-sort-value="0.79" | 790 m || 
|-id=514 bgcolor=#d6d6d6
| 421514 ||  || — || January 10, 2006 || Kitt Peak || Spacewatch || EOS || align=right | 2.1 km || 
|-id=515 bgcolor=#E9E9E9
| 421515 ||  || — || October 22, 2006 || Catalina || CSS || — || align=right | 1.7 km || 
|-id=516 bgcolor=#d6d6d6
| 421516 ||  || — || December 28, 2005 || Kitt Peak || Spacewatch || — || align=right | 3.7 km || 
|-id=517 bgcolor=#fefefe
| 421517 ||  || — || September 10, 2007 || Kitt Peak || Spacewatch || — || align=right data-sort-value="0.64" | 640 m || 
|-id=518 bgcolor=#E9E9E9
| 421518 ||  || — || August 29, 2005 || Palomar || NEAT || — || align=right | 2.4 km || 
|-id=519 bgcolor=#fefefe
| 421519 ||  || — || March 4, 2010 || Kitt Peak || Spacewatch || — || align=right data-sort-value="0.66" | 660 m || 
|-id=520 bgcolor=#fefefe
| 421520 ||  || — || December 18, 2007 || Kitt Peak || Spacewatch || — || align=right data-sort-value="0.71" | 710 m || 
|-id=521 bgcolor=#d6d6d6
| 421521 ||  || — || December 14, 1993 || Kitt Peak || Spacewatch || HYG || align=right | 3.1 km || 
|-id=522 bgcolor=#E9E9E9
| 421522 ||  || — || January 1, 2008 || Kitt Peak || Spacewatch || — || align=right | 2.0 km || 
|-id=523 bgcolor=#E9E9E9
| 421523 ||  || — || February 20, 2009 || Kitt Peak || Spacewatch || (5) || align=right data-sort-value="0.70" | 700 m || 
|-id=524 bgcolor=#fefefe
| 421524 ||  || — || April 25, 2006 || Kitt Peak || Spacewatch || MAS || align=right data-sort-value="0.67" | 670 m || 
|-id=525 bgcolor=#d6d6d6
| 421525 ||  || — || August 19, 2009 || Kitt Peak || Spacewatch || — || align=right | 2.3 km || 
|-id=526 bgcolor=#d6d6d6
| 421526 ||  || — || February 13, 2002 || Kitt Peak || Spacewatch || — || align=right | 3.0 km || 
|-id=527 bgcolor=#d6d6d6
| 421527 ||  || — || January 7, 2006 || Mount Lemmon || Mount Lemmon Survey || — || align=right | 2.6 km || 
|-id=528 bgcolor=#E9E9E9
| 421528 ||  || — || January 3, 2009 || Mount Lemmon || Mount Lemmon Survey || — || align=right | 1.8 km || 
|-id=529 bgcolor=#fefefe
| 421529 ||  || — || November 18, 2003 || Kitt Peak || Spacewatch || — || align=right | 1.0 km || 
|-id=530 bgcolor=#E9E9E9
| 421530 ||  || — || December 1, 2011 || Mount Lemmon || Mount Lemmon Survey || MAR || align=right | 1.0 km || 
|-id=531 bgcolor=#E9E9E9
| 421531 ||  || — || October 28, 2006 || Catalina || CSS || — || align=right | 1.7 km || 
|-id=532 bgcolor=#fefefe
| 421532 ||  || — || May 1, 2003 || Kitt Peak || Spacewatch || — || align=right data-sort-value="0.66" | 660 m || 
|-id=533 bgcolor=#d6d6d6
| 421533 ||  || — || October 7, 2005 || Mount Lemmon || Mount Lemmon Survey || KOR || align=right | 1.2 km || 
|-id=534 bgcolor=#fefefe
| 421534 ||  || — || September 6, 2008 || Mount Lemmon || Mount Lemmon Survey || — || align=right data-sort-value="0.56" | 560 m || 
|-id=535 bgcolor=#E9E9E9
| 421535 ||  || — || December 19, 2007 || Mount Lemmon || Mount Lemmon Survey || — || align=right | 1.2 km || 
|-id=536 bgcolor=#E9E9E9
| 421536 ||  || — || April 20, 2009 || Kitt Peak || Spacewatch || — || align=right | 2.7 km || 
|-id=537 bgcolor=#d6d6d6
| 421537 ||  || — || January 14, 2012 || Kitt Peak || Spacewatch || — || align=right | 2.5 km || 
|-id=538 bgcolor=#E9E9E9
| 421538 ||  || — || September 10, 2010 || Kitt Peak || Spacewatch || — || align=right | 2.6 km || 
|-id=539 bgcolor=#E9E9E9
| 421539 ||  || — || September 14, 2006 || Catalina || CSS || — || align=right | 1.1 km || 
|-id=540 bgcolor=#d6d6d6
| 421540 ||  || — || November 30, 2005 || Mount Lemmon || Mount Lemmon Survey || — || align=right | 3.3 km || 
|-id=541 bgcolor=#d6d6d6
| 421541 ||  || — || January 7, 2006 || Kitt Peak || Spacewatch || — || align=right | 3.4 km || 
|-id=542 bgcolor=#fefefe
| 421542 ||  || — || March 18, 2010 || Kitt Peak || Spacewatch || — || align=right data-sort-value="0.61" | 610 m || 
|-id=543 bgcolor=#E9E9E9
| 421543 ||  || — || October 3, 2006 || Mount Lemmon || Mount Lemmon Survey || WIT || align=right | 1.1 km || 
|-id=544 bgcolor=#fefefe
| 421544 ||  || — || December 4, 2005 || Kitt Peak || Spacewatch || — || align=right data-sort-value="0.81" | 810 m || 
|-id=545 bgcolor=#fefefe
| 421545 ||  || — || October 18, 2007 || Kitt Peak || Spacewatch || V || align=right data-sort-value="0.58" | 580 m || 
|-id=546 bgcolor=#d6d6d6
| 421546 ||  || — || April 23, 1996 || Kitt Peak || Spacewatch || VER || align=right | 2.8 km || 
|-id=547 bgcolor=#E9E9E9
| 421547 ||  || — || April 15, 2005 || Kitt Peak || Spacewatch || — || align=right | 1.1 km || 
|-id=548 bgcolor=#E9E9E9
| 421548 ||  || — || July 5, 2005 || Mount Lemmon || Mount Lemmon Survey || — || align=right | 1.6 km || 
|-id=549 bgcolor=#fefefe
| 421549 ||  || — || September 4, 2007 || Catalina || CSS || — || align=right data-sort-value="0.75" | 750 m || 
|-id=550 bgcolor=#d6d6d6
| 421550 ||  || — || September 28, 2009 || Mount Lemmon || Mount Lemmon Survey || — || align=right | 3.5 km || 
|-id=551 bgcolor=#d6d6d6
| 421551 ||  || — || September 13, 2004 || Kitt Peak || Spacewatch || — || align=right | 1.9 km || 
|-id=552 bgcolor=#fefefe
| 421552 ||  || — || October 27, 2003 || Kitt Peak || Spacewatch || — || align=right data-sort-value="0.86" | 860 m || 
|-id=553 bgcolor=#d6d6d6
| 421553 ||  || — || September 29, 2003 || Anderson Mesa || LONEOS || — || align=right | 4.6 km || 
|-id=554 bgcolor=#fefefe
| 421554 ||  || — || October 4, 2003 || Kitt Peak || Spacewatch || — || align=right data-sort-value="0.94" | 940 m || 
|-id=555 bgcolor=#d6d6d6
| 421555 ||  || — || November 1, 2010 || Mount Lemmon || Mount Lemmon Survey || — || align=right | 3.0 km || 
|-id=556 bgcolor=#d6d6d6
| 421556 ||  || — || March 16, 2007 || Mount Lemmon || Mount Lemmon Survey || — || align=right | 2.7 km || 
|-id=557 bgcolor=#d6d6d6
| 421557 ||  || — || February 25, 2006 || Kitt Peak || Spacewatch || — || align=right | 3.2 km || 
|-id=558 bgcolor=#d6d6d6
| 421558 ||  || — || September 17, 2003 || Kitt Peak || Spacewatch || (159) || align=right | 2.3 km || 
|-id=559 bgcolor=#E9E9E9
| 421559 ||  || — || October 20, 2001 || Socorro || LINEAR || — || align=right | 1.4 km || 
|-id=560 bgcolor=#fefefe
| 421560 ||  || — || October 21, 2003 || Anderson Mesa || LONEOS || NYS || align=right data-sort-value="0.70" | 700 m || 
|-id=561 bgcolor=#d6d6d6
| 421561 ||  || — || January 23, 2006 || Kitt Peak || Spacewatch || — || align=right | 3.5 km || 
|-id=562 bgcolor=#fefefe
| 421562 ||  || — || October 24, 2003 || Kitt Peak || Spacewatch || MAS || align=right data-sort-value="0.75" | 750 m || 
|-id=563 bgcolor=#d6d6d6
| 421563 ||  || — || September 23, 2008 || Kitt Peak || Spacewatch || 7:4 || align=right | 4.0 km || 
|-id=564 bgcolor=#E9E9E9
| 421564 ||  || — || October 16, 2001 || Cima Ekar || ADAS || — || align=right | 1.6 km || 
|-id=565 bgcolor=#E9E9E9
| 421565 ||  || — || February 13, 2004 || Kitt Peak || Spacewatch || — || align=right | 1.8 km || 
|-id=566 bgcolor=#E9E9E9
| 421566 ||  || — || January 11, 2008 || Mount Lemmon || Mount Lemmon Survey || — || align=right | 1.1 km || 
|-id=567 bgcolor=#d6d6d6
| 421567 ||  || — || February 21, 2007 || Kitt Peak || Spacewatch || KOR || align=right | 1.7 km || 
|-id=568 bgcolor=#fefefe
| 421568 ||  || — || June 21, 2007 || Mount Lemmon || Mount Lemmon Survey || — || align=right data-sort-value="0.72" | 720 m || 
|-id=569 bgcolor=#d6d6d6
| 421569 ||  || — || August 8, 2004 || Palomar || NEAT || — || align=right | 2.4 km || 
|-id=570 bgcolor=#E9E9E9
| 421570 ||  || — || March 10, 2008 || Mount Lemmon || Mount Lemmon Survey || — || align=right | 1.9 km || 
|-id=571 bgcolor=#E9E9E9
| 421571 ||  || — || October 27, 2005 || Kitt Peak || Spacewatch || — || align=right | 1.8 km || 
|-id=572 bgcolor=#d6d6d6
| 421572 ||  || — || September 20, 2009 || Kitt Peak || Spacewatch || EOS || align=right | 2.4 km || 
|-id=573 bgcolor=#E9E9E9
| 421573 ||  || — || September 1, 2005 || Kitt Peak || Spacewatch || — || align=right | 2.3 km || 
|-id=574 bgcolor=#fefefe
| 421574 ||  || — || March 25, 2006 || Kitt Peak || Spacewatch || NYS || align=right data-sort-value="0.81" | 810 m || 
|-id=575 bgcolor=#fefefe
| 421575 ||  || — || October 28, 1997 || Kitt Peak || Spacewatch || — || align=right data-sort-value="0.54" | 540 m || 
|-id=576 bgcolor=#fefefe
| 421576 ||  || — || June 18, 2010 || Mount Lemmon || Mount Lemmon Survey || — || align=right data-sort-value="0.60" | 600 m || 
|-id=577 bgcolor=#d6d6d6
| 421577 ||  || — || October 16, 2009 || Mount Lemmon || Mount Lemmon Survey || — || align=right | 2.4 km || 
|-id=578 bgcolor=#d6d6d6
| 421578 ||  || — || July 29, 2008 || Kitt Peak || Spacewatch || — || align=right | 3.5 km || 
|-id=579 bgcolor=#E9E9E9
| 421579 ||  || — || June 29, 2005 || Kitt Peak || Spacewatch || — || align=right | 3.2 km || 
|-id=580 bgcolor=#d6d6d6
| 421580 ||  || — || February 21, 2007 || Mount Lemmon || Mount Lemmon Survey || — || align=right | 2.4 km || 
|-id=581 bgcolor=#fefefe
| 421581 ||  || — || March 8, 2005 || Mount Lemmon || Mount Lemmon Survey || — || align=right | 1.1 km || 
|-id=582 bgcolor=#E9E9E9
| 421582 ||  || — || August 29, 2005 || Kitt Peak || Spacewatch || — || align=right | 1.3 km || 
|-id=583 bgcolor=#fefefe
| 421583 ||  || — || September 30, 2003 || Kitt Peak || Spacewatch || — || align=right data-sort-value="0.84" | 840 m || 
|-id=584 bgcolor=#d6d6d6
| 421584 ||  || — || July 30, 2008 || Mount Lemmon || Mount Lemmon Survey || — || align=right | 3.1 km || 
|-id=585 bgcolor=#E9E9E9
| 421585 ||  || — || March 31, 2008 || Mount Lemmon || Mount Lemmon Survey || MRX || align=right data-sort-value="0.91" | 910 m || 
|-id=586 bgcolor=#E9E9E9
| 421586 ||  || — || November 6, 2010 || Kitt Peak || Spacewatch || — || align=right | 1.6 km || 
|-id=587 bgcolor=#E9E9E9
| 421587 ||  || — || December 5, 2010 || Mount Lemmon || Mount Lemmon Survey || — || align=right | 2.0 km || 
|-id=588 bgcolor=#d6d6d6
| 421588 ||  || — || December 3, 2010 || Mount Lemmon || Mount Lemmon Survey || — || align=right | 2.1 km || 
|-id=589 bgcolor=#fefefe
| 421589 ||  || — || October 2, 2003 || Kitt Peak || Spacewatch || NYS || align=right data-sort-value="0.58" | 580 m || 
|-id=590 bgcolor=#E9E9E9
| 421590 ||  || — || August 31, 2005 || Palomar || NEAT || — || align=right | 2.1 km || 
|-id=591 bgcolor=#E9E9E9
| 421591 ||  || — || April 6, 2005 || Kitt Peak || Spacewatch || — || align=right | 2.1 km || 
|-id=592 bgcolor=#d6d6d6
| 421592 ||  || — || October 30, 2010 || Catalina || CSS || 615 || align=right | 1.8 km || 
|-id=593 bgcolor=#fefefe
| 421593 ||  || — || March 9, 2002 || Kitt Peak || Spacewatch || — || align=right data-sort-value="0.80" | 800 m || 
|-id=594 bgcolor=#E9E9E9
| 421594 ||  || — || February 13, 2008 || Kitt Peak || Spacewatch || — || align=right | 1.8 km || 
|-id=595 bgcolor=#E9E9E9
| 421595 ||  || — || November 15, 2006 || Mount Lemmon || Mount Lemmon Survey || — || align=right | 2.6 km || 
|-id=596 bgcolor=#fefefe
| 421596 ||  || — || September 13, 2007 || Mount Lemmon || Mount Lemmon Survey || — || align=right data-sort-value="0.87" | 870 m || 
|-id=597 bgcolor=#d6d6d6
| 421597 ||  || — || October 16, 2009 || Mount Lemmon || Mount Lemmon Survey || — || align=right | 3.1 km || 
|-id=598 bgcolor=#fefefe
| 421598 ||  || — || October 2, 1999 || Kitt Peak || Spacewatch || NYS || align=right data-sort-value="0.82" | 820 m || 
|-id=599 bgcolor=#d6d6d6
| 421599 ||  || — || September 23, 2008 || Mount Lemmon || Mount Lemmon Survey || THM || align=right | 2.2 km || 
|-id=600 bgcolor=#E9E9E9
| 421600 ||  || — || March 29, 2004 || Kitt Peak || Spacewatch || — || align=right | 1.4 km || 
|}

421601–421700 

|-bgcolor=#d6d6d6
| 421601 ||  || — || September 22, 2003 || Anderson Mesa || LONEOS ||  || align=right | 3.4 km || 
|-id=602 bgcolor=#E9E9E9
| 421602 ||  || — || January 30, 2004 || Kitt Peak || Spacewatch || — || align=right data-sort-value="0.94" | 940 m || 
|-id=603 bgcolor=#E9E9E9
| 421603 ||  || — || January 17, 2007 || Kitt Peak || Spacewatch || HOF || align=right | 2.5 km || 
|-id=604 bgcolor=#E9E9E9
| 421604 ||  || — || February 7, 2003 || Kitt Peak || Spacewatch || — || align=right | 1.6 km || 
|-id=605 bgcolor=#E9E9E9
| 421605 ||  || — || October 31, 2010 || Mount Lemmon || Mount Lemmon Survey || — || align=right | 1.3 km || 
|-id=606 bgcolor=#E9E9E9
| 421606 ||  || — || February 3, 2008 || Kitt Peak || Spacewatch || — || align=right | 1.2 km || 
|-id=607 bgcolor=#fefefe
| 421607 ||  || — || October 29, 2008 || Kitt Peak || Spacewatch || — || align=right data-sort-value="0.59" | 590 m || 
|-id=608 bgcolor=#fefefe
| 421608 ||  || — || September 28, 2008 || Mount Lemmon || Mount Lemmon Survey || — || align=right data-sort-value="0.64" | 640 m || 
|-id=609 bgcolor=#fefefe
| 421609 ||  || — || October 3, 2003 || Kitt Peak || Spacewatch || — || align=right data-sort-value="0.69" | 690 m || 
|-id=610 bgcolor=#d6d6d6
| 421610 ||  || — || September 30, 2005 || Mount Lemmon || Mount Lemmon Survey || KOR || align=right | 1.5 km || 
|-id=611 bgcolor=#d6d6d6
| 421611 ||  || — || October 30, 2005 || Kitt Peak || Spacewatch || — || align=right | 2.3 km || 
|-id=612 bgcolor=#E9E9E9
| 421612 ||  || — || April 24, 2001 || Kitt Peak || Spacewatch || — || align=right data-sort-value="0.97" | 970 m || 
|-id=613 bgcolor=#E9E9E9
| 421613 ||  || — || March 1, 2009 || Kitt Peak || Spacewatch || — || align=right data-sort-value="0.98" | 980 m || 
|-id=614 bgcolor=#d6d6d6
| 421614 ||  || — || December 5, 1999 || Kitt Peak || Spacewatch || VER || align=right | 3.3 km || 
|-id=615 bgcolor=#E9E9E9
| 421615 ||  || — || February 11, 2004 || Kitt Peak || Spacewatch || — || align=right | 1.2 km || 
|-id=616 bgcolor=#d6d6d6
| 421616 ||  || — || January 23, 2006 || Kitt Peak || Spacewatch || — || align=right | 2.6 km || 
|-id=617 bgcolor=#E9E9E9
| 421617 ||  || — || October 10, 2010 || Mount Lemmon || Mount Lemmon Survey || AGN || align=right | 1.3 km || 
|-id=618 bgcolor=#fefefe
| 421618 ||  || — || March 13, 2002 || Kitt Peak || Spacewatch || — || align=right data-sort-value="0.75" | 750 m || 
|-id=619 bgcolor=#fefefe
| 421619 ||  || — || November 21, 2007 || Mount Lemmon || Mount Lemmon Survey || V || align=right data-sort-value="0.80" | 800 m || 
|-id=620 bgcolor=#d6d6d6
| 421620 ||  || — || December 11, 2004 || Kitt Peak || Spacewatch || VER || align=right | 3.5 km || 
|-id=621 bgcolor=#E9E9E9
| 421621 ||  || — || March 11, 2008 || Kitt Peak || Spacewatch || — || align=right | 1.7 km || 
|-id=622 bgcolor=#d6d6d6
| 421622 ||  || — || March 16, 2007 || Kitt Peak || Spacewatch || EOS || align=right | 2.3 km || 
|-id=623 bgcolor=#fefefe
| 421623 ||  || — || August 10, 2007 || Kitt Peak || Spacewatch || V || align=right data-sort-value="0.56" | 560 m || 
|-id=624 bgcolor=#E9E9E9
| 421624 ||  || — || October 25, 2005 || Mount Lemmon || Mount Lemmon Survey || — || align=right | 2.2 km || 
|-id=625 bgcolor=#E9E9E9
| 421625 ||  || — || November 21, 2006 || Mount Lemmon || Mount Lemmon Survey || — || align=right | 1.1 km || 
|-id=626 bgcolor=#E9E9E9
| 421626 ||  || — || October 17, 2010 || Mount Lemmon || Mount Lemmon Survey || — || align=right | 1.7 km || 
|-id=627 bgcolor=#d6d6d6
| 421627 ||  || — || July 26, 2003 || Palomar || NEAT || — || align=right | 2.2 km || 
|-id=628 bgcolor=#E9E9E9
| 421628 ||  || — || November 11, 2001 || Apache Point || SDSS || — || align=right | 2.1 km || 
|-id=629 bgcolor=#fefefe
| 421629 ||  || — || October 7, 1999 || Kitt Peak || Spacewatch || — || align=right data-sort-value="0.84" | 840 m || 
|-id=630 bgcolor=#E9E9E9
| 421630 ||  || — || August 23, 2001 || Kitt Peak || Spacewatch || — || align=right | 1.4 km || 
|-id=631 bgcolor=#d6d6d6
| 421631 ||  || — || April 29, 2008 || Mount Lemmon || Mount Lemmon Survey || KOR || align=right | 1.5 km || 
|-id=632 bgcolor=#fefefe
| 421632 ||  || — || February 3, 2009 || Kitt Peak || Spacewatch || — || align=right data-sort-value="0.78" | 780 m || 
|-id=633 bgcolor=#d6d6d6
| 421633 ||  || — || December 10, 2010 || Mount Lemmon || Mount Lemmon Survey || — || align=right | 3.2 km || 
|-id=634 bgcolor=#fefefe
| 421634 ||  || — || July 7, 2010 || Kitt Peak || Spacewatch || — || align=right data-sort-value="0.86" | 860 m || 
|-id=635 bgcolor=#E9E9E9
| 421635 ||  || — || October 2, 2005 || Mount Lemmon || Mount Lemmon Survey || AGN || align=right | 1.2 km || 
|-id=636 bgcolor=#E9E9E9
| 421636 ||  || — || February 19, 2009 || Kitt Peak || Spacewatch || EUN || align=right | 1.2 km || 
|-id=637 bgcolor=#d6d6d6
| 421637 ||  || — || January 6, 2006 || Kitt Peak || Spacewatch || EOS || align=right | 1.7 km || 
|-id=638 bgcolor=#E9E9E9
| 421638 ||  || — || October 2, 2006 || Mount Lemmon || Mount Lemmon Survey || — || align=right | 1.2 km || 
|-id=639 bgcolor=#fefefe
| 421639 ||  || — || January 23, 2006 || Kitt Peak || Spacewatch || — || align=right data-sort-value="0.75" | 750 m || 
|-id=640 bgcolor=#E9E9E9
| 421640 ||  || — || November 20, 2007 || Kitt Peak || Spacewatch || — || align=right data-sort-value="0.92" | 920 m || 
|-id=641 bgcolor=#fefefe
| 421641 ||  || — || August 10, 2007 || Kitt Peak || Spacewatch || — || align=right data-sort-value="0.62" | 620 m || 
|-id=642 bgcolor=#d6d6d6
| 421642 ||  || — || January 7, 2006 || Kitt Peak || Spacewatch || EOS || align=right | 1.6 km || 
|-id=643 bgcolor=#E9E9E9
| 421643 ||  || — || November 13, 2007 || Kitt Peak || Spacewatch || — || align=right data-sort-value="0.90" | 900 m || 
|-id=644 bgcolor=#d6d6d6
| 421644 ||  || — || November 16, 2010 || Mount Lemmon || Mount Lemmon Survey || EOS || align=right | 1.8 km || 
|-id=645 bgcolor=#E9E9E9
| 421645 ||  || — || October 29, 2010 || Mount Lemmon || Mount Lemmon Survey || — || align=right | 2.1 km || 
|-id=646 bgcolor=#E9E9E9
| 421646 ||  || — || October 27, 2006 || Kitt Peak || Spacewatch || — || align=right | 1.3 km || 
|-id=647 bgcolor=#E9E9E9
| 421647 ||  || — || February 2, 2005 || Kitt Peak || Spacewatch || — || align=right data-sort-value="0.86" | 860 m || 
|-id=648 bgcolor=#fefefe
| 421648 ||  || — || March 13, 2007 || Kitt Peak || Spacewatch || — || align=right data-sort-value="0.67" | 670 m || 
|-id=649 bgcolor=#d6d6d6
| 421649 ||  || — || February 2, 2006 || Mount Lemmon || Mount Lemmon Survey ||  || align=right | 3.6 km || 
|-id=650 bgcolor=#FA8072
| 421650 ||  || — || December 15, 2006 || Mount Lemmon || Mount Lemmon Survey || — || align=right | 1.5 km || 
|-id=651 bgcolor=#fefefe
| 421651 ||  || — || September 28, 2003 || Kitt Peak || Spacewatch || — || align=right data-sort-value="0.69" | 690 m || 
|-id=652 bgcolor=#d6d6d6
| 421652 ||  || — || December 28, 2000 || Kitt Peak || Spacewatch || — || align=right | 3.7 km || 
|-id=653 bgcolor=#d6d6d6
| 421653 ||  || — || April 22, 2007 || Kitt Peak || Spacewatch || — || align=right | 2.8 km || 
|-id=654 bgcolor=#fefefe
| 421654 ||  || — || April 22, 2007 || Mount Lemmon || Mount Lemmon Survey || — || align=right data-sort-value="0.62" | 620 m || 
|-id=655 bgcolor=#fefefe
| 421655 ||  || — || December 25, 2005 || Kitt Peak || Spacewatch || — || align=right data-sort-value="0.58" | 580 m || 
|-id=656 bgcolor=#d6d6d6
| 421656 ||  || — || February 21, 2007 || Mount Lemmon || Mount Lemmon Survey || — || align=right | 2.0 km || 
|-id=657 bgcolor=#E9E9E9
| 421657 ||  || — || April 12, 2004 || Kitt Peak || Spacewatch || — || align=right | 2.0 km || 
|-id=658 bgcolor=#E9E9E9
| 421658 ||  || — || December 18, 2007 || Mount Lemmon || Mount Lemmon Survey || — || align=right | 2.5 km || 
|-id=659 bgcolor=#d6d6d6
| 421659 ||  || — || August 18, 2009 || Kitt Peak || Spacewatch || — || align=right | 3.5 km || 
|-id=660 bgcolor=#E9E9E9
| 421660 ||  || — || January 12, 2008 || Kitt Peak || Spacewatch || — || align=right | 1.3 km || 
|-id=661 bgcolor=#fefefe
| 421661 ||  || — || September 11, 2007 || Kitt Peak || Spacewatch || — || align=right data-sort-value="0.62" | 620 m || 
|-id=662 bgcolor=#E9E9E9
| 421662 ||  || — || August 23, 2001 || Kitt Peak || Spacewatch || — || align=right | 1.3 km || 
|-id=663 bgcolor=#d6d6d6
| 421663 ||  || — || February 28, 2006 || Catalina || CSS || EOS || align=right | 2.8 km || 
|-id=664 bgcolor=#fefefe
| 421664 ||  || — || April 5, 2010 || Kitt Peak || Spacewatch || — || align=right data-sort-value="0.87" | 870 m || 
|-id=665 bgcolor=#d6d6d6
| 421665 ||  || — || September 6, 1999 || Kitt Peak || Spacewatch || — || align=right | 2.3 km || 
|-id=666 bgcolor=#E9E9E9
| 421666 ||  || — || August 29, 2006 || Kitt Peak || Spacewatch || — || align=right data-sort-value="0.96" | 960 m || 
|-id=667 bgcolor=#fefefe
| 421667 ||  || — || February 13, 2009 || Mount Lemmon || Mount Lemmon Survey || — || align=right data-sort-value="0.91" | 910 m || 
|-id=668 bgcolor=#fefefe
| 421668 ||  || — || May 8, 2002 || Kitt Peak || Spacewatch || — || align=right data-sort-value="0.82" | 820 m || 
|-id=669 bgcolor=#fefefe
| 421669 ||  || — || February 19, 2009 || Kitt Peak || Spacewatch || — || align=right | 1.0 km || 
|-id=670 bgcolor=#E9E9E9
| 421670 ||  || — || February 20, 2009 || Kitt Peak || Spacewatch || — || align=right | 1.0 km || 
|-id=671 bgcolor=#fefefe
| 421671 ||  || — || December 3, 2007 || Kitt Peak || Spacewatch || NYS || align=right data-sort-value="0.93" | 930 m || 
|-id=672 bgcolor=#fefefe
| 421672 ||  || — || October 17, 2003 || Kitt Peak || Spacewatch || — || align=right data-sort-value="0.91" | 910 m || 
|-id=673 bgcolor=#d6d6d6
| 421673 ||  || — || January 7, 2006 || Kitt Peak || Spacewatch || EOS || align=right | 1.8 km || 
|-id=674 bgcolor=#E9E9E9
| 421674 ||  || — || October 2, 2006 || Mount Lemmon || Mount Lemmon Survey || — || align=right | 2.2 km || 
|-id=675 bgcolor=#d6d6d6
| 421675 ||  || — || February 9, 2007 || Catalina || CSS || EOS || align=right | 2.3 km || 
|-id=676 bgcolor=#d6d6d6
| 421676 ||  || — || October 4, 2004 || Kitt Peak || Spacewatch || EMA || align=right | 3.8 km || 
|-id=677 bgcolor=#E9E9E9
| 421677 ||  || — || September 1, 2005 || Palomar || NEAT || — || align=right | 2.3 km || 
|-id=678 bgcolor=#fefefe
| 421678 ||  || — || October 21, 2007 || Mount Lemmon || Mount Lemmon Survey || — || align=right | 1.0 km || 
|-id=679 bgcolor=#E9E9E9
| 421679 ||  || — || August 26, 2002 || Palomar || NEAT || — || align=right | 1.1 km || 
|-id=680 bgcolor=#E9E9E9
| 421680 ||  || — || December 5, 2007 || Mount Lemmon || Mount Lemmon Survey || — || align=right | 1.0 km || 
|-id=681 bgcolor=#E9E9E9
| 421681 ||  || — || February 7, 2008 || Kitt Peak || Spacewatch || — || align=right | 1.5 km || 
|-id=682 bgcolor=#E9E9E9
| 421682 ||  || — || October 14, 2001 || Apache Point || SDSS || — || align=right | 1.8 km || 
|-id=683 bgcolor=#fefefe
| 421683 ||  || — || July 8, 2010 || Kitt Peak || Spacewatch || — || align=right | 1.2 km || 
|-id=684 bgcolor=#d6d6d6
| 421684 ||  || — || September 13, 1998 || Kitt Peak || Spacewatch || — || align=right | 3.7 km || 
|-id=685 bgcolor=#d6d6d6
| 421685 ||  || — || September 17, 2009 || Catalina || CSS || — || align=right | 2.5 km || 
|-id=686 bgcolor=#E9E9E9
| 421686 ||  || — || October 16, 1977 || Palomar || PLS || — || align=right | 1.1 km || 
|-id=687 bgcolor=#d6d6d6
| 421687 ||  || — || October 14, 2004 || Anderson Mesa || LONEOS || — || align=right | 2.8 km || 
|-id=688 bgcolor=#E9E9E9
| 421688 ||  || — || September 21, 2001 || Space Surveillance || LONEOS || — || align=right | 2.2 km || 
|-id=689 bgcolor=#fefefe
| 421689 ||  || — || October 8, 2007 || Catalina || CSS || — || align=right | 1.0 km || 
|-id=690 bgcolor=#E9E9E9
| 421690 ||  || — || November 18, 2006 || Mount Lemmon || Mount Lemmon Survey || — || align=right | 1.5 km || 
|-id=691 bgcolor=#E9E9E9
| 421691 ||  || — || October 17, 2006 || Kitt Peak || Spacewatch || — || align=right | 1.4 km || 
|-id=692 bgcolor=#E9E9E9
| 421692 ||  || — || August 26, 2005 || Palomar || NEAT || — || align=right | 2.3 km || 
|-id=693 bgcolor=#d6d6d6
| 421693 ||  || — || March 31, 2008 || Kitt Peak || Spacewatch || KOR || align=right | 1.3 km || 
|-id=694 bgcolor=#fefefe
| 421694 ||  || — || January 20, 2009 || Mount Lemmon || Mount Lemmon Survey || V || align=right data-sort-value="0.80" | 800 m || 
|-id=695 bgcolor=#d6d6d6
| 421695 ||  || — || April 6, 2008 || Kitt Peak || Spacewatch || — || align=right | 2.6 km || 
|-id=696 bgcolor=#E9E9E9
| 421696 ||  || — || September 30, 2006 || Catalina || CSS || critical || align=right | 1.3 km || 
|-id=697 bgcolor=#E9E9E9
| 421697 ||  || — || September 25, 2006 || Mount Lemmon || Mount Lemmon Survey || — || align=right | 1.3 km || 
|-id=698 bgcolor=#E9E9E9
| 421698 ||  || — || April 11, 2005 || Mount Lemmon || Mount Lemmon Survey || — || align=right data-sort-value="0.82" | 820 m || 
|-id=699 bgcolor=#fefefe
| 421699 ||  || — || September 9, 2007 || Kitt Peak || Spacewatch || — || align=right data-sort-value="0.88" | 880 m || 
|-id=700 bgcolor=#d6d6d6
| 421700 ||  || — || February 13, 2007 || Mount Lemmon || Mount Lemmon Survey || — || align=right | 2.8 km || 
|}

421701–421800 

|-bgcolor=#fefefe
| 421701 ||  || — || November 2, 2007 || Kitt Peak || Spacewatch || — || align=right | 1.0 km || 
|-id=702 bgcolor=#fefefe
| 421702 ||  || — || December 31, 2011 || Mount Lemmon || Mount Lemmon Survey || — || align=right | 1.1 km || 
|-id=703 bgcolor=#fefefe
| 421703 ||  || — || June 23, 2007 || Kitt Peak || Spacewatch || — || align=right data-sort-value="0.60" | 600 m || 
|-id=704 bgcolor=#d6d6d6
| 421704 ||  || — || February 11, 2000 || Kitt Peak || Spacewatch || VER || align=right | 2.5 km || 
|-id=705 bgcolor=#d6d6d6
| 421705 ||  || — || September 4, 2003 || Kitt Peak || Spacewatch || THM || align=right | 2.3 km || 
|-id=706 bgcolor=#E9E9E9
| 421706 ||  || — || February 2, 2008 || Mount Lemmon || Mount Lemmon Survey || — || align=right data-sort-value="0.94" | 940 m || 
|-id=707 bgcolor=#fefefe
| 421707 ||  || — || January 17, 2009 || Kitt Peak || Spacewatch || — || align=right data-sort-value="0.87" | 870 m || 
|-id=708 bgcolor=#d6d6d6
| 421708 ||  || — || December 12, 1998 || Kitt Peak || Spacewatch || — || align=right | 3.1 km || 
|-id=709 bgcolor=#fefefe
| 421709 ||  || — || January 5, 2012 || Kitt Peak || Spacewatch || — || align=right data-sort-value="0.97" | 970 m || 
|-id=710 bgcolor=#E9E9E9
| 421710 ||  || — || September 23, 2001 || Kitt Peak || Spacewatch ||  || align=right | 1.4 km || 
|-id=711 bgcolor=#E9E9E9
| 421711 ||  || — || August 31, 2005 || Kitt Peak || Spacewatch || — || align=right | 2.0 km || 
|-id=712 bgcolor=#fefefe
| 421712 ||  || — || January 17, 2009 || Kitt Peak || Spacewatch || V || align=right data-sort-value="0.66" | 660 m || 
|-id=713 bgcolor=#E9E9E9
| 421713 ||  || — || November 22, 2006 || Kitt Peak || Spacewatch ||  || align=right | 1.4 km || 
|-id=714 bgcolor=#E9E9E9
| 421714 ||  || — || December 27, 2006 || Mount Lemmon || Mount Lemmon Survey || — || align=right | 2.4 km || 
|-id=715 bgcolor=#E9E9E9
| 421715 ||  || — || April 20, 2009 || Mount Lemmon || Mount Lemmon Survey || — || align=right data-sort-value="0.82" | 820 m || 
|-id=716 bgcolor=#E9E9E9
| 421716 ||  || — || November 27, 2006 || Kitt Peak || Spacewatch || — || align=right | 2.4 km || 
|-id=717 bgcolor=#d6d6d6
| 421717 ||  || — || September 7, 2004 || Kitt Peak || Spacewatch || — || align=right | 2.9 km || 
|-id=718 bgcolor=#E9E9E9
| 421718 ||  || — || October 1, 2005 || Kitt Peak || Spacewatch || AST || align=right | 1.7 km || 
|-id=719 bgcolor=#fefefe
| 421719 ||  || — || November 3, 2007 || Mount Lemmon || Mount Lemmon Survey || — || align=right | 1.1 km || 
|-id=720 bgcolor=#E9E9E9
| 421720 ||  || — || January 27, 2007 || Kitt Peak || Spacewatch || — || align=right | 1.8 km || 
|-id=721 bgcolor=#fefefe
| 421721 ||  || — || September 16, 2003 || Kitt Peak || Spacewatch || — || align=right data-sort-value="0.65" | 650 m || 
|-id=722 bgcolor=#E9E9E9
| 421722 ||  || — || November 17, 2006 || Kitt Peak || Spacewatch || — || align=right | 1.5 km || 
|-id=723 bgcolor=#d6d6d6
| 421723 ||  || — || September 16, 2009 || Kitt Peak || Spacewatch || — || align=right | 3.1 km || 
|-id=724 bgcolor=#d6d6d6
| 421724 ||  || — || April 24, 2008 || Mount Lemmon || Mount Lemmon Survey || — || align=right | 2.5 km || 
|-id=725 bgcolor=#E9E9E9
| 421725 ||  || — || March 6, 2008 || Mount Lemmon || Mount Lemmon Survey || — || align=right | 1.9 km || 
|-id=726 bgcolor=#fefefe
| 421726 ||  || — || August 12, 1999 || Kitt Peak || Spacewatch || — || align=right data-sort-value="0.77" | 770 m || 
|-id=727 bgcolor=#fefefe
| 421727 ||  || — || May 7, 2010 || Catalina || CSS || — || align=right data-sort-value="0.89" | 890 m || 
|-id=728 bgcolor=#E9E9E9
| 421728 ||  || — || October 23, 2006 || Mount Lemmon || Mount Lemmon Survey || — || align=right | 1.4 km || 
|-id=729 bgcolor=#E9E9E9
| 421729 ||  || — || May 8, 2005 || Kitt Peak || Spacewatch || — || align=right data-sort-value="0.82" | 820 m || 
|-id=730 bgcolor=#fefefe
| 421730 ||  || — || December 22, 2008 || Mount Lemmon || Mount Lemmon Survey || — || align=right data-sort-value="0.63" | 630 m || 
|-id=731 bgcolor=#E9E9E9
| 421731 ||  || — || June 22, 1995 || Kitt Peak || Spacewatch || — || align=right | 2.5 km || 
|-id=732 bgcolor=#E9E9E9
| 421732 ||  || — || October 31, 2010 || Mount Lemmon || Mount Lemmon Survey || — || align=right | 2.8 km || 
|-id=733 bgcolor=#d6d6d6
| 421733 ||  || — || February 24, 2008 || Mount Lemmon || Mount Lemmon Survey || — || align=right | 2.4 km || 
|-id=734 bgcolor=#d6d6d6
| 421734 ||  || — || November 30, 2005 || Mount Lemmon || Mount Lemmon Survey || KOR || align=right | 1.5 km || 
|-id=735 bgcolor=#d6d6d6
| 421735 ||  || — || October 10, 2008 || Mount Lemmon || Mount Lemmon Survey || SYL7:4 || align=right | 5.0 km || 
|-id=736 bgcolor=#E9E9E9
| 421736 ||  || — || August 27, 2006 || Kitt Peak || Spacewatch || — || align=right data-sort-value="0.83" | 830 m || 
|-id=737 bgcolor=#d6d6d6
| 421737 ||  || — || September 28, 2009 || Kitt Peak || Spacewatch || — || align=right | 2.5 km || 
|-id=738 bgcolor=#E9E9E9
| 421738 ||  || — || September 16, 2006 || Catalina || CSS || — || align=right | 1.0 km || 
|-id=739 bgcolor=#E9E9E9
| 421739 ||  || — || October 7, 2005 || Mount Lemmon || Mount Lemmon Survey || — || align=right | 2.6 km || 
|-id=740 bgcolor=#d6d6d6
| 421740 ||  || — || March 11, 2007 || Kitt Peak || Spacewatch || — || align=right | 2.7 km || 
|-id=741 bgcolor=#d6d6d6
| 421741 ||  || — || March 20, 2001 || Kitt Peak || Spacewatch || — || align=right | 3.2 km || 
|-id=742 bgcolor=#fefefe
| 421742 ||  || — || December 22, 2008 || Kitt Peak || Spacewatch || — || align=right data-sort-value="0.65" | 650 m || 
|-id=743 bgcolor=#d6d6d6
| 421743 ||  || — || December 1, 2005 || Kitt Peak || Spacewatch || — || align=right | 3.0 km || 
|-id=744 bgcolor=#d6d6d6
| 421744 ||  || — || February 2, 2006 || Kitt Peak || Spacewatch || — || align=right | 2.7 km || 
|-id=745 bgcolor=#E9E9E9
| 421745 ||  || — || February 1, 2005 || Kitt Peak || Spacewatch || — || align=right | 1.1 km || 
|-id=746 bgcolor=#fefefe
| 421746 ||  || — || June 6, 2011 || Mount Lemmon || Mount Lemmon Survey || H || align=right data-sort-value="0.48" | 480 m || 
|-id=747 bgcolor=#fefefe
| 421747 ||  || — || February 4, 2006 || Kitt Peak || Spacewatch || — || align=right data-sort-value="0.89" | 890 m || 
|-id=748 bgcolor=#E9E9E9
| 421748 ||  || — || August 29, 2005 || Anderson Mesa || LONEOS || — || align=right | 2.4 km || 
|-id=749 bgcolor=#d6d6d6
| 421749 ||  || — || February 21, 2007 || Mount Lemmon || Mount Lemmon Survey || — || align=right | 2.5 km || 
|-id=750 bgcolor=#d6d6d6
| 421750 ||  || — || September 11, 2004 || Kitt Peak || Spacewatch || — || align=right | 2.7 km || 
|-id=751 bgcolor=#E9E9E9
| 421751 ||  || — || September 18, 2001 || Kitt Peak || Spacewatch || — || align=right | 1.6 km || 
|-id=752 bgcolor=#d6d6d6
| 421752 ||  || — || August 17, 2009 || Kitt Peak || Spacewatch || — || align=right | 2.3 km || 
|-id=753 bgcolor=#d6d6d6
| 421753 ||  || — || September 27, 2009 || Catalina || CSS || — || align=right | 2.3 km || 
|-id=754 bgcolor=#d6d6d6
| 421754 ||  || — || September 29, 2009 || Mount Lemmon || Mount Lemmon Survey || — || align=right | 2.7 km || 
|-id=755 bgcolor=#fefefe
| 421755 ||  || — || October 20, 2003 || Kitt Peak || Spacewatch || — || align=right data-sort-value="0.75" | 750 m || 
|-id=756 bgcolor=#E9E9E9
| 421756 ||  || — || August 26, 2005 || Palomar || NEAT || — || align=right | 2.4 km || 
|-id=757 bgcolor=#E9E9E9
| 421757 ||  || — || February 18, 2008 || Mount Lemmon || Mount Lemmon Survey || — || align=right | 2.0 km || 
|-id=758 bgcolor=#fefefe
| 421758 ||  || — || September 27, 2008 || Mount Lemmon || Mount Lemmon Survey || — || align=right data-sort-value="0.86" | 860 m || 
|-id=759 bgcolor=#E9E9E9
| 421759 ||  || — || October 28, 2006 || Catalina || CSS || — || align=right | 1.4 km || 
|-id=760 bgcolor=#d6d6d6
| 421760 ||  || — || September 30, 2003 || Anderson Mesa || LONEOS || LIX || align=right | 2.4 km || 
|-id=761 bgcolor=#E9E9E9
| 421761 ||  || — || November 14, 1998 || Kitt Peak || Spacewatch || — || align=right data-sort-value="0.89" | 890 m || 
|-id=762 bgcolor=#E9E9E9
| 421762 ||  || — || September 30, 2006 || Kitt Peak || Spacewatch || — || align=right | 1.0 km || 
|-id=763 bgcolor=#E9E9E9
| 421763 ||  || — || October 7, 2010 || Catalina || CSS || — || align=right | 1.6 km || 
|-id=764 bgcolor=#E9E9E9
| 421764 ||  || — || November 19, 2001 || Anderson Mesa || LONEOS || — || align=right | 2.2 km || 
|-id=765 bgcolor=#E9E9E9
| 421765 ||  || — || January 30, 2004 || Kitt Peak || Spacewatch || — || align=right data-sort-value="0.94" | 940 m || 
|-id=766 bgcolor=#d6d6d6
| 421766 ||  || — || May 5, 2008 || Mount Lemmon || Mount Lemmon Survey || — || align=right | 2.8 km || 
|-id=767 bgcolor=#d6d6d6
| 421767 ||  || — || February 4, 2006 || Mount Lemmon || Mount Lemmon Survey || — || align=right | 3.1 km || 
|-id=768 bgcolor=#fefefe
| 421768 ||  || — || October 17, 2007 || Mount Lemmon || Mount Lemmon Survey || — || align=right | 1.0 km || 
|-id=769 bgcolor=#fefefe
| 421769 ||  || — || March 17, 2013 || Mount Lemmon || Mount Lemmon Survey || — || align=right data-sort-value="0.81" | 810 m || 
|-id=770 bgcolor=#E9E9E9
| 421770 ||  || — || September 13, 2005 || Catalina || CSS || — || align=right | 2.9 km || 
|-id=771 bgcolor=#FA8072
| 421771 ||  || — || January 3, 2000 || Socorro || LINEAR || — || align=right | 1.9 km || 
|-id=772 bgcolor=#d6d6d6
| 421772 ||  || — || November 30, 2005 || Anderson Mesa || LONEOS || — || align=right | 3.3 km || 
|-id=773 bgcolor=#E9E9E9
| 421773 ||  || — || July 21, 2006 || Mount Lemmon || Mount Lemmon Survey || MAR || align=right | 1.2 km || 
|-id=774 bgcolor=#d6d6d6
| 421774 Jeffreyrose ||  ||  || December 20, 2009 || Mount Lemmon || Mount Lemmon Survey || EOS || align=right | 2.7 km || 
|-id=775 bgcolor=#d6d6d6
| 421775 ||  || — || January 10, 2006 || Mount Lemmon || Mount Lemmon Survey || — || align=right | 4.8 km || 
|-id=776 bgcolor=#d6d6d6
| 421776 ||  || — || October 19, 2003 || Kitt Peak || Spacewatch || — || align=right | 3.7 km || 
|-id=777 bgcolor=#fefefe
| 421777 ||  || — || September 30, 2003 || Kitt Peak || Spacewatch || — || align=right | 1.0 km || 
|-id=778 bgcolor=#E9E9E9
| 421778 ||  || — || October 18, 2001 || Palomar || NEAT || — || align=right | 2.5 km || 
|-id=779 bgcolor=#d6d6d6
| 421779 ||  || — || December 6, 2005 || Mount Lemmon || Mount Lemmon Survey || — || align=right | 3.4 km || 
|-id=780 bgcolor=#d6d6d6
| 421780 ||  || — || March 13, 2007 || Mount Lemmon || Mount Lemmon Survey || — || align=right | 2.9 km || 
|-id=781 bgcolor=#fefefe
| 421781 ||  || — || August 14, 2004 || Campo Imperatore || CINEOS || — || align=right data-sort-value="0.70" | 700 m || 
|-id=782 bgcolor=#d6d6d6
| 421782 ||  || — || October 27, 2005 || Mount Lemmon || Mount Lemmon Survey || — || align=right | 2.3 km || 
|-id=783 bgcolor=#d6d6d6
| 421783 ||  || — || October 14, 2009 || Catalina || CSS || — || align=right | 2.9 km || 
|-id=784 bgcolor=#d6d6d6
| 421784 ||  || — || September 17, 2003 || Kitt Peak || Spacewatch || EOS || align=right | 2.1 km || 
|-id=785 bgcolor=#d6d6d6
| 421785 ||  || — || September 17, 2009 || Kitt Peak || Spacewatch || — || align=right | 3.2 km || 
|-id=786 bgcolor=#E9E9E9
| 421786 ||  || — || March 10, 2008 || Kitt Peak || Spacewatch || — || align=right | 2.1 km || 
|-id=787 bgcolor=#d6d6d6
| 421787 ||  || — || March 14, 2007 || Kitt Peak || Spacewatch || — || align=right | 2.7 km || 
|-id=788 bgcolor=#d6d6d6
| 421788 ||  || — || March 22, 2001 || Kitt Peak || Spacewatch || — || align=right | 3.8 km || 
|-id=789 bgcolor=#E9E9E9
| 421789 ||  || — || October 9, 2010 || Mount Lemmon || Mount Lemmon Survey || — || align=right | 2.1 km || 
|-id=790 bgcolor=#d6d6d6
| 421790 ||  || — || October 19, 2003 || Palomar || NEAT || — || align=right | 4.1 km || 
|-id=791 bgcolor=#E9E9E9
| 421791 ||  || — || August 25, 2005 || Campo Imperatore || CINEOS || — || align=right | 2.1 km || 
|-id=792 bgcolor=#d6d6d6
| 421792 ||  || — || October 20, 2003 || Palomar || NEAT || LIX || align=right | 2.8 km || 
|-id=793 bgcolor=#E9E9E9
| 421793 ||  || — || February 26, 2004 || Kitt Peak || M. W. Buie || — || align=right | 1.1 km || 
|-id=794 bgcolor=#fefefe
| 421794 ||  || — || May 4, 2006 || Mount Lemmon || Mount Lemmon Survey || — || align=right data-sort-value="0.76" | 760 m || 
|-id=795 bgcolor=#E9E9E9
| 421795 ||  || — || March 22, 2009 || Mount Lemmon || Mount Lemmon Survey || — || align=right data-sort-value="0.86" | 860 m || 
|-id=796 bgcolor=#fefefe
| 421796 ||  || — || September 12, 2007 || Catalina || CSS || — || align=right data-sort-value="0.89" | 890 m || 
|-id=797 bgcolor=#d6d6d6
| 421797 ||  || — || September 17, 2003 || Kitt Peak || Spacewatch || — || align=right | 2.6 km || 
|-id=798 bgcolor=#d6d6d6
| 421798 ||  || — || September 19, 1995 || Kitt Peak || Spacewatch || — || align=right | 2.2 km || 
|-id=799 bgcolor=#d6d6d6
| 421799 ||  || — || August 15, 2009 || Kitt Peak || Spacewatch || — || align=right | 2.2 km || 
|-id=800 bgcolor=#d6d6d6
| 421800 ||  || — || January 5, 2006 || Mount Lemmon || Mount Lemmon Survey || — || align=right | 2.9 km || 
|}

421801–421900 

|-bgcolor=#d6d6d6
| 421801 ||  || — || April 24, 2007 || Mount Lemmon || Mount Lemmon Survey || EOS || align=right | 1.8 km || 
|-id=802 bgcolor=#d6d6d6
| 421802 ||  || — || July 11, 2009 || Kitt Peak || Spacewatch || — || align=right | 3.2 km || 
|-id=803 bgcolor=#fefefe
| 421803 ||  || — || June 6, 2003 || Kitt Peak || Spacewatch || — || align=right | 1.6 km || 
|-id=804 bgcolor=#E9E9E9
| 421804 ||  || — || May 16, 2005 || Mount Lemmon || Mount Lemmon Survey || (5) || align=right | 1.0 km || 
|-id=805 bgcolor=#E9E9E9
| 421805 ||  || — || August 30, 2005 || Kitt Peak || Spacewatch || PAD || align=right | 1.5 km || 
|-id=806 bgcolor=#E9E9E9
| 421806 ||  || — || February 13, 2008 || Mount Lemmon || Mount Lemmon Survey || — || align=right | 2.0 km || 
|-id=807 bgcolor=#d6d6d6
| 421807 ||  || — || August 20, 2009 || Kitt Peak || Spacewatch || — || align=right | 2.3 km || 
|-id=808 bgcolor=#d6d6d6
| 421808 ||  || — || February 21, 2007 || Kitt Peak || Spacewatch || — || align=right | 2.9 km || 
|-id=809 bgcolor=#fefefe
| 421809 ||  || — || July 5, 2003 || Sandlot || Spacewatch || — || align=right data-sort-value="0.90" | 900 m || 
|-id=810 bgcolor=#E9E9E9
| 421810 ||  || — || August 30, 2005 || Kitt Peak || Spacewatch || — || align=right | 2.1 km || 
|-id=811 bgcolor=#d6d6d6
| 421811 ||  || — || December 27, 2005 || Kitt Peak || Spacewatch || — || align=right | 2.7 km || 
|-id=812 bgcolor=#fefefe
| 421812 ||  || — || November 19, 2008 || Mount Lemmon || Mount Lemmon Survey || — || align=right data-sort-value="0.89" | 890 m || 
|-id=813 bgcolor=#E9E9E9
| 421813 ||  || — || February 11, 2008 || Mount Lemmon || Mount Lemmon Survey || — || align=right | 1.5 km || 
|-id=814 bgcolor=#d6d6d6
| 421814 ||  || — || March 16, 2007 || Kitt Peak || Spacewatch || — || align=right | 3.1 km || 
|-id=815 bgcolor=#d6d6d6
| 421815 ||  || — || December 30, 2005 || Kitt Peak || Spacewatch || EOS || align=right | 2.3 km || 
|-id=816 bgcolor=#E9E9E9
| 421816 ||  || — || August 30, 2002 || Kitt Peak || Spacewatch || — || align=right | 1.1 km || 
|-id=817 bgcolor=#d6d6d6
| 421817 ||  || — || September 16, 2009 || Mount Lemmon || Mount Lemmon Survey || — || align=right | 3.5 km || 
|-id=818 bgcolor=#E9E9E9
| 421818 ||  || — || September 11, 1994 || Kitt Peak || Spacewatch || — || align=right data-sort-value="0.86" | 860 m || 
|-id=819 bgcolor=#fefefe
| 421819 ||  || — || February 13, 2002 || Kitt Peak || Spacewatch || — || align=right data-sort-value="0.78" | 780 m || 
|-id=820 bgcolor=#d6d6d6
| 421820 ||  || — || October 22, 2003 || Apache Point || SDSS || — || align=right | 2.9 km || 
|-id=821 bgcolor=#d6d6d6
| 421821 ||  || — || January 10, 2006 || Kitt Peak || Spacewatch || EOS || align=right | 2.7 km || 
|-id=822 bgcolor=#d6d6d6
| 421822 ||  || — || December 9, 2004 || Kitt Peak || Spacewatch || — || align=right | 3.2 km || 
|-id=823 bgcolor=#d6d6d6
| 421823 ||  || — || September 25, 2009 || Catalina || CSS || — || align=right | 4.0 km || 
|-id=824 bgcolor=#fefefe
| 421824 ||  || — || October 12, 2007 || Mount Lemmon || Mount Lemmon Survey || — || align=right | 1.0 km || 
|-id=825 bgcolor=#d6d6d6
| 421825 ||  || — || March 13, 2007 || Kitt Peak || Spacewatch || — || align=right | 3.4 km || 
|-id=826 bgcolor=#E9E9E9
| 421826 ||  || — || February 24, 2009 || Kitt Peak || Spacewatch || — || align=right | 1.0 km || 
|-id=827 bgcolor=#fefefe
| 421827 ||  || — || February 14, 2005 || Kitt Peak || Spacewatch || — || align=right data-sort-value="0.81" | 810 m || 
|-id=828 bgcolor=#d6d6d6
| 421828 ||  || — || February 23, 2012 || Mount Lemmon || Mount Lemmon Survey || — || align=right | 3.2 km || 
|-id=829 bgcolor=#E9E9E9
| 421829 ||  || — || September 10, 2010 || Kitt Peak || Spacewatch || — || align=right | 2.2 km || 
|-id=830 bgcolor=#d6d6d6
| 421830 ||  || — || February 2, 2006 || Kitt Peak || Spacewatch || — || align=right | 3.0 km || 
|-id=831 bgcolor=#d6d6d6
| 421831 ||  || — || February 4, 2006 || Mount Lemmon || Mount Lemmon Survey || — || align=right | 2.7 km || 
|-id=832 bgcolor=#E9E9E9
| 421832 ||  || — || October 17, 2010 || Mount Lemmon || Mount Lemmon Survey || EUN || align=right | 1.2 km || 
|-id=833 bgcolor=#E9E9E9
| 421833 ||  || — || October 1, 2005 || Kitt Peak || Spacewatch || AGN || align=right | 1.2 km || 
|-id=834 bgcolor=#E9E9E9
| 421834 ||  || — || August 30, 2005 || Campo Imperatore || CINEOS || — || align=right | 2.0 km || 
|-id=835 bgcolor=#fefefe
| 421835 ||  || — || December 26, 2005 || Kitt Peak || Spacewatch || — || align=right data-sort-value="0.66" | 660 m || 
|-id=836 bgcolor=#fefefe
| 421836 ||  || — || May 6, 2006 || Mount Lemmon || Mount Lemmon Survey || — || align=right data-sort-value="0.87" | 870 m || 
|-id=837 bgcolor=#d6d6d6
| 421837 ||  || — || November 26, 2005 || Kitt Peak || Spacewatch || KOR || align=right | 1.1 km || 
|-id=838 bgcolor=#E9E9E9
| 421838 ||  || — || September 17, 2006 || Kitt Peak || Spacewatch || (5) || align=right data-sort-value="0.89" | 890 m || 
|-id=839 bgcolor=#fefefe
| 421839 ||  || — || January 26, 2000 || Kitt Peak || Spacewatch || — || align=right data-sort-value="0.66" | 660 m || 
|-id=840 bgcolor=#fefefe
| 421840 ||  || — || April 8, 2003 || Kitt Peak || Spacewatch || — || align=right data-sort-value="0.58" | 580 m || 
|-id=841 bgcolor=#E9E9E9
| 421841 ||  || — || July 29, 2000 || Cerro Tololo || M. W. Buie || AGN || align=right | 1.1 km || 
|-id=842 bgcolor=#fefefe
| 421842 ||  || — || October 11, 2007 || Catalina || CSS || — || align=right data-sort-value="0.70" | 700 m || 
|-id=843 bgcolor=#fefefe
| 421843 ||  || — || January 18, 2009 || Kitt Peak || Spacewatch || — || align=right data-sort-value="0.75" | 750 m || 
|-id=844 bgcolor=#d6d6d6
| 421844 ||  || — || August 11, 1997 || Kitt Peak || Spacewatch || THM || align=right | 2.1 km || 
|-id=845 bgcolor=#fefefe
| 421845 ||  || — || September 24, 1995 || Kitt Peak || Spacewatch || — || align=right data-sort-value="0.74" | 740 m || 
|-id=846 bgcolor=#d6d6d6
| 421846 ||  || — || October 8, 1999 || Kitt Peak || Spacewatch || — || align=right | 2.0 km || 
|-id=847 bgcolor=#fefefe
| 421847 ||  || — || November 15, 1998 || Kitt Peak || Spacewatch || — || align=right data-sort-value="0.54" | 540 m || 
|-id=848 bgcolor=#E9E9E9
| 421848 ||  || — || March 31, 2008 || Kitt Peak || Spacewatch || — || align=right | 2.0 km || 
|-id=849 bgcolor=#fefefe
| 421849 ||  || — || April 7, 2006 || Kitt Peak || Spacewatch || NYS || align=right data-sort-value="0.55" | 550 m || 
|-id=850 bgcolor=#E9E9E9
| 421850 ||  || — || September 5, 2000 || Kitt Peak || Spacewatch || — || align=right | 2.1 km || 
|-id=851 bgcolor=#E9E9E9
| 421851 ||  || — || December 12, 2006 || Kitt Peak || Spacewatch ||  || align=right | 1.3 km || 
|-id=852 bgcolor=#d6d6d6
| 421852 ||  || — || March 10, 2007 || Kitt Peak || Spacewatch || THM || align=right | 2.2 km || 
|-id=853 bgcolor=#d6d6d6
| 421853 ||  || — || February 1, 2006 || Kitt Peak || Spacewatch || — || align=right | 2.8 km || 
|-id=854 bgcolor=#E9E9E9
| 421854 ||  || — || November 15, 2010 || Mount Lemmon || Mount Lemmon Survey || — || align=right | 1.8 km || 
|-id=855 bgcolor=#fefefe
| 421855 ||  || — || December 28, 2005 || Mount Lemmon || Mount Lemmon Survey || — || align=right data-sort-value="0.59" | 590 m || 
|-id=856 bgcolor=#fefefe
| 421856 ||  || — || September 17, 2003 || Kitt Peak || Spacewatch || — || align=right data-sort-value="0.73" | 730 m || 
|-id=857 bgcolor=#fefefe
| 421857 ||  || — || September 3, 1999 || Kitt Peak || Spacewatch || — || align=right data-sort-value="0.91" | 910 m || 
|-id=858 bgcolor=#fefefe
| 421858 ||  || — || July 22, 1995 || Kitt Peak || Spacewatch || MAS || align=right data-sort-value="0.73" | 730 m || 
|-id=859 bgcolor=#E9E9E9
| 421859 ||  || — || February 14, 2004 || Kitt Peak || Spacewatch || — || align=right | 1.0 km || 
|-id=860 bgcolor=#E9E9E9
| 421860 ||  || — || September 23, 2000 || Anderson Mesa || LONEOS || — || align=right | 2.9 km || 
|-id=861 bgcolor=#d6d6d6
| 421861 ||  || — || October 26, 2009 || Mount Lemmon || Mount Lemmon Survey || — || align=right | 2.5 km || 
|-id=862 bgcolor=#E9E9E9
| 421862 ||  || — || May 3, 2009 || Kitt Peak || Spacewatch || — || align=right | 1.4 km || 
|-id=863 bgcolor=#E9E9E9
| 421863 ||  || — || December 27, 2006 || Mount Lemmon || Mount Lemmon Survey || HOF || align=right | 2.2 km || 
|-id=864 bgcolor=#E9E9E9
| 421864 ||  || — || October 11, 2010 || Mount Lemmon || Mount Lemmon Survey || NEM || align=right | 2.0 km || 
|-id=865 bgcolor=#E9E9E9
| 421865 ||  || — || September 29, 2005 || Kitt Peak || Spacewatch || — || align=right | 2.1 km || 
|-id=866 bgcolor=#fefefe
| 421866 ||  || — || April 25, 2006 || Mount Lemmon || Mount Lemmon Survey || — || align=right data-sort-value="0.76" | 760 m || 
|-id=867 bgcolor=#fefefe
| 421867 ||  || — || November 30, 2005 || Kitt Peak || Spacewatch || — || align=right data-sort-value="0.75" | 750 m || 
|-id=868 bgcolor=#d6d6d6
| 421868 ||  || — || August 22, 2003 || Palomar || NEAT || HYG || align=right | 3.5 km || 
|-id=869 bgcolor=#E9E9E9
| 421869 ||  || — || October 23, 2006 || Mount Lemmon || Mount Lemmon Survey || — || align=right | 1.5 km || 
|-id=870 bgcolor=#fefefe
| 421870 ||  || — || October 12, 2007 || Mount Lemmon || Mount Lemmon Survey || — || align=right data-sort-value="0.87" | 870 m || 
|-id=871 bgcolor=#d6d6d6
| 421871 ||  || — || October 11, 2004 || Kitt Peak || Spacewatch || — || align=right | 3.0 km || 
|-id=872 bgcolor=#d6d6d6
| 421872 ||  || — || September 15, 2009 || Mount Lemmon || Mount Lemmon Survey || EOS || align=right | 2.4 km || 
|-id=873 bgcolor=#fefefe
| 421873 ||  || — || November 2, 2011 || Kitt Peak || Spacewatch || — || align=right data-sort-value="0.94" | 940 m || 
|-id=874 bgcolor=#E9E9E9
| 421874 ||  || — || May 27, 2000 || Socorro || LINEAR || EUN || align=right | 2.0 km || 
|-id=875 bgcolor=#E9E9E9
| 421875 ||  || — || June 27, 2005 || Mount Lemmon || Mount Lemmon Survey || — || align=right | 1.3 km || 
|-id=876 bgcolor=#fefefe
| 421876 ||  || — || November 12, 2005 || Kitt Peak || Spacewatch || — || align=right data-sort-value="0.74" | 740 m || 
|-id=877 bgcolor=#d6d6d6
| 421877 ||  || — || February 2, 2006 || Mount Lemmon || Mount Lemmon Survey || — || align=right | 2.4 km || 
|-id=878 bgcolor=#d6d6d6
| 421878 ||  || — || October 26, 2009 || Mount Lemmon || Mount Lemmon Survey || — || align=right | 3.1 km || 
|-id=879 bgcolor=#E9E9E9
| 421879 ||  || — || September 4, 2010 || Mount Lemmon || Mount Lemmon Survey || BRG || align=right | 1.4 km || 
|-id=880 bgcolor=#d6d6d6
| 421880 ||  || — || December 5, 2005 || Kitt Peak || Spacewatch || — || align=right | 2.2 km || 
|-id=881 bgcolor=#E9E9E9
| 421881 ||  || — || August 19, 2006 || Kitt Peak || Spacewatch || — || align=right data-sort-value="0.73" | 730 m || 
|-id=882 bgcolor=#fefefe
| 421882 ||  || — || November 5, 2007 || Mount Lemmon || Mount Lemmon Survey || — || align=right data-sort-value="0.71" | 710 m || 
|-id=883 bgcolor=#d6d6d6
| 421883 ||  || — || September 18, 2003 || Kitt Peak || Spacewatch || — || align=right | 2.6 km || 
|-id=884 bgcolor=#fefefe
| 421884 ||  || — || February 20, 2002 || Kitt Peak || Spacewatch || — || align=right data-sort-value="0.58" | 580 m || 
|-id=885 bgcolor=#d6d6d6
| 421885 ||  || — || September 30, 2003 || Kitt Peak || Spacewatch || — || align=right | 2.5 km || 
|-id=886 bgcolor=#fefefe
| 421886 ||  || — || September 12, 2007 || Mount Lemmon || Mount Lemmon Survey || MAS || align=right data-sort-value="0.99" | 990 m || 
|-id=887 bgcolor=#fefefe
| 421887 ||  || — || September 16, 2003 || Kitt Peak || Spacewatch || — || align=right data-sort-value="0.80" | 800 m || 
|-id=888 bgcolor=#E9E9E9
| 421888 ||  || — || August 5, 2005 || Palomar || NEAT || GEF || align=right data-sort-value="0.98" | 980 m || 
|-id=889 bgcolor=#d6d6d6
| 421889 ||  || — || July 8, 2003 || Palomar || NEAT || — || align=right | 3.4 km || 
|-id=890 bgcolor=#d6d6d6
| 421890 ||  || — || December 5, 2005 || Kitt Peak || Spacewatch || — || align=right | 2.9 km || 
|-id=891 bgcolor=#E9E9E9
| 421891 ||  || — || February 9, 2008 || Kitt Peak || Spacewatch || — || align=right | 2.5 km || 
|-id=892 bgcolor=#d6d6d6
| 421892 ||  || — || January 23, 2006 || Mount Lemmon || Mount Lemmon Survey || EOS || align=right | 1.7 km || 
|-id=893 bgcolor=#fefefe
| 421893 ||  || — || September 12, 2004 || Kitt Peak || Spacewatch || — || align=right data-sort-value="0.89" | 890 m || 
|-id=894 bgcolor=#d6d6d6
| 421894 ||  || — || September 28, 2009 || Mount Lemmon || Mount Lemmon Survey || — || align=right | 3.3 km || 
|-id=895 bgcolor=#E9E9E9
| 421895 ||  || — || February 12, 2008 || Mount Lemmon || Mount Lemmon Survey || — || align=right | 2.2 km || 
|-id=896 bgcolor=#E9E9E9
| 421896 ||  || — || September 2, 2010 || Mount Lemmon || Mount Lemmon Survey || — || align=right | 1.2 km || 
|-id=897 bgcolor=#d6d6d6
| 421897 ||  || — || August 6, 2004 || Palomar || NEAT || — || align=right | 2.4 km || 
|-id=898 bgcolor=#d6d6d6
| 421898 ||  || — || November 21, 2005 || Kitt Peak || Spacewatch || — || align=right | 2.4 km || 
|-id=899 bgcolor=#fefefe
| 421899 ||  || — || April 11, 2010 || Kitt Peak || Spacewatch || — || align=right data-sort-value="0.63" | 630 m || 
|-id=900 bgcolor=#d6d6d6
| 421900 ||  || — || November 26, 2005 || Kitt Peak || Spacewatch || KOR || align=right | 1.4 km || 
|}

421901–422000 

|-bgcolor=#E9E9E9
| 421901 ||  || — || December 12, 2006 || Mount Lemmon || Mount Lemmon Survey || AST || align=right | 1.5 km || 
|-id=902 bgcolor=#E9E9E9
| 421902 ||  || — || December 14, 2006 || Mount Lemmon || Mount Lemmon Survey || — || align=right | 1.2 km || 
|-id=903 bgcolor=#d6d6d6
| 421903 ||  || — || September 21, 2003 || Kitt Peak || Spacewatch || VER || align=right | 2.9 km || 
|-id=904 bgcolor=#d6d6d6
| 421904 ||  || — || February 10, 2000 || Kitt Peak || Spacewatch || — || align=right | 3.4 km || 
|-id=905 bgcolor=#fefefe
| 421905 ||  || — || November 7, 2007 || Kitt Peak || Spacewatch || — || align=right | 1.1 km || 
|-id=906 bgcolor=#fefefe
| 421906 ||  || — || February 1, 2006 || Mount Lemmon || Mount Lemmon Survey || — || align=right data-sort-value="0.67" | 670 m || 
|-id=907 bgcolor=#d6d6d6
| 421907 ||  || — || October 13, 1999 || Apache Point || SDSS || — || align=right | 2.6 km || 
|-id=908 bgcolor=#E9E9E9
| 421908 ||  || — || October 15, 2001 || Palomar || NEAT || EUN || align=right | 1.4 km || 
|-id=909 bgcolor=#d6d6d6
| 421909 ||  || — || September 17, 2009 || Kitt Peak || Spacewatch || — || align=right | 2.4 km || 
|-id=910 bgcolor=#E9E9E9
| 421910 ||  || — || February 2, 2008 || Kitt Peak || Spacewatch || NEM || align=right | 2.0 km || 
|-id=911 bgcolor=#fefefe
| 421911 ||  || — || September 18, 2003 || Haleakala || NEAT || H || align=right data-sort-value="0.57" | 570 m || 
|-id=912 bgcolor=#E9E9E9
| 421912 ||  || — || September 27, 2005 || Kitt Peak || Spacewatch || AGN || align=right | 1.2 km || 
|-id=913 bgcolor=#d6d6d6
| 421913 ||  || — || March 25, 2007 || Mount Lemmon || Mount Lemmon Survey || KOR || align=right | 1.3 km || 
|-id=914 bgcolor=#E9E9E9
| 421914 ||  || — || October 1, 2006 || Kitt Peak || Spacewatch || — || align=right data-sort-value="0.91" | 910 m || 
|-id=915 bgcolor=#d6d6d6
| 421915 ||  || — || March 21, 2001 || Kitt Peak || Spacewatch || — || align=right | 3.4 km || 
|-id=916 bgcolor=#E9E9E9
| 421916 ||  || — || January 27, 2007 || Kitt Peak || Spacewatch || AGN || align=right | 1.3 km || 
|-id=917 bgcolor=#d6d6d6
| 421917 ||  || — || January 27, 2007 || Mount Lemmon || Mount Lemmon Survey || — || align=right | 2.7 km || 
|-id=918 bgcolor=#d6d6d6
| 421918 ||  || — || October 27, 1998 || Kitt Peak || Spacewatch || THM || align=right | 1.6 km || 
|-id=919 bgcolor=#fefefe
| 421919 ||  || — || March 29, 2001 || Kitt Peak || Spacewatch || — || align=right | 1.0 km || 
|-id=920 bgcolor=#d6d6d6
| 421920 ||  || — || March 5, 2002 || Kitt Peak || Spacewatch || KOR || align=right | 1.2 km || 
|-id=921 bgcolor=#E9E9E9
| 421921 ||  || — || September 19, 1998 || Kitt Peak || Spacewatch || — || align=right data-sort-value="0.84" | 840 m || 
|-id=922 bgcolor=#E9E9E9
| 421922 ||  || — || March 23, 2003 || Apache Point || SDSS || — || align=right | 1.8 km || 
|-id=923 bgcolor=#E9E9E9
| 421923 ||  || — || July 27, 2009 || Catalina || CSS || — || align=right | 2.4 km || 
|-id=924 bgcolor=#fefefe
| 421924 ||  || — || September 18, 1995 || Kitt Peak || Spacewatch || — || align=right data-sort-value="0.72" | 720 m || 
|-id=925 bgcolor=#E9E9E9
| 421925 ||  || — || December 14, 2006 || Mount Lemmon || Mount Lemmon Survey || — || align=right | 1.4 km || 
|-id=926 bgcolor=#d6d6d6
| 421926 ||  || — || January 5, 2006 || Kitt Peak || Spacewatch || HYG || align=right | 2.7 km || 
|-id=927 bgcolor=#E9E9E9
| 421927 ||  || — || May 10, 2005 || Kitt Peak || Spacewatch || — || align=right | 1.0 km || 
|-id=928 bgcolor=#d6d6d6
| 421928 ||  || — || January 17, 2004 || Kitt Peak || Spacewatch || 7:4 || align=right | 3.7 km || 
|-id=929 bgcolor=#fefefe
| 421929 ||  || — || October 14, 2007 || Mount Lemmon || Mount Lemmon Survey || — || align=right data-sort-value="0.87" | 870 m || 
|-id=930 bgcolor=#d6d6d6
| 421930 ||  || — || October 1, 2003 || Kitt Peak || Spacewatch || — || align=right | 2.3 km || 
|-id=931 bgcolor=#d6d6d6
| 421931 ||  || — || May 3, 2008 || Mount Lemmon || Mount Lemmon Survey || — || align=right | 2.5 km || 
|-id=932 bgcolor=#d6d6d6
| 421932 ||  || — || January 31, 2006 || Kitt Peak || Spacewatch || THM || align=right | 2.5 km || 
|-id=933 bgcolor=#E9E9E9
| 421933 ||  || — || August 28, 2005 || Kitt Peak || Spacewatch || — || align=right | 2.3 km || 
|-id=934 bgcolor=#d6d6d6
| 421934 ||  || — || August 18, 2009 || Kitt Peak || Spacewatch || — || align=right | 2.7 km || 
|-id=935 bgcolor=#E9E9E9
| 421935 ||  || — || September 19, 1998 || Apache Point || SDSS || — || align=right data-sort-value="0.99" | 990 m || 
|-id=936 bgcolor=#d6d6d6
| 421936 ||  || — || March 31, 1995 || Kitt Peak || Spacewatch || — || align=right | 4.2 km || 
|-id=937 bgcolor=#d6d6d6
| 421937 ||  || — || January 23, 2011 || Mount Lemmon || Mount Lemmon Survey || — || align=right | 3.9 km || 
|-id=938 bgcolor=#d6d6d6
| 421938 ||  || — || April 8, 2002 || Cerro Tololo || M. W. Buie || — || align=right | 2.6 km || 
|-id=939 bgcolor=#E9E9E9
| 421939 ||  || — || October 5, 2005 || Catalina || CSS || — || align=right | 2.1 km || 
|-id=940 bgcolor=#d6d6d6
| 421940 ||  || — || December 30, 2000 || Kitt Peak || Spacewatch || — || align=right | 3.3 km || 
|-id=941 bgcolor=#E9E9E9
| 421941 ||  || — || January 11, 2008 || Kitt Peak || Spacewatch || — || align=right | 1.2 km || 
|-id=942 bgcolor=#d6d6d6
| 421942 ||  || — || September 28, 2003 || Apache Point || SDSS || — || align=right | 2.5 km || 
|-id=943 bgcolor=#E9E9E9
| 421943 ||  || — || March 27, 2008 || Mount Lemmon || Mount Lemmon Survey || — || align=right | 2.7 km || 
|-id=944 bgcolor=#d6d6d6
| 421944 ||  || — || October 23, 2004 || Kitt Peak || Spacewatch || EOS || align=right | 2.4 km || 
|-id=945 bgcolor=#d6d6d6
| 421945 ||  || — || May 1, 2001 || Kitt Peak || Spacewatch || — || align=right | 3.7 km || 
|-id=946 bgcolor=#d6d6d6
| 421946 ||  || — || September 26, 2003 || Apache Point || SDSS || VER || align=right | 2.7 km || 
|-id=947 bgcolor=#E9E9E9
| 421947 ||  || — || October 21, 2001 || Kitt Peak || Spacewatch || — || align=right | 2.3 km || 
|-id=948 bgcolor=#fefefe
| 421948 ||  || — || September 5, 2007 || Catalina || CSS || — || align=right | 1.1 km || 
|-id=949 bgcolor=#E9E9E9
| 421949 ||  || — || December 1, 2010 || Mount Lemmon || Mount Lemmon Survey || — || align=right | 2.4 km || 
|-id=950 bgcolor=#d6d6d6
| 421950 ||  || — || October 27, 2005 || Mount Lemmon || Mount Lemmon Survey || — || align=right | 2.7 km || 
|-id=951 bgcolor=#d6d6d6
| 421951 ||  || — || October 23, 2004 || Kitt Peak || Spacewatch || EOS || align=right | 2.1 km || 
|-id=952 bgcolor=#fefefe
| 421952 ||  || — || April 19, 2006 || Catalina || CSS || — || align=right data-sort-value="0.85" | 850 m || 
|-id=953 bgcolor=#fefefe
| 421953 ||  || — || May 9, 2002 || Palomar || NEAT || — || align=right | 1.1 km || 
|-id=954 bgcolor=#d6d6d6
| 421954 ||  || — || August 20, 2009 || Kitt Peak || Spacewatch || — || align=right | 2.5 km || 
|-id=955 bgcolor=#d6d6d6
| 421955 ||  || — || February 20, 2001 || Kitt Peak || Spacewatch || — || align=right | 3.4 km || 
|-id=956 bgcolor=#E9E9E9
| 421956 ||  || — || July 12, 2005 || Mount Lemmon || Mount Lemmon Survey || MIS || align=right | 2.8 km || 
|-id=957 bgcolor=#E9E9E9
| 421957 ||  || — || November 11, 2001 || Apache Point || SDSS || GEF || align=right | 1.2 km || 
|-id=958 bgcolor=#fefefe
| 421958 ||  || — || September 11, 2007 || Mount Lemmon || Mount Lemmon Survey || — || align=right data-sort-value="0.65" | 650 m || 
|-id=959 bgcolor=#fefefe
| 421959 ||  || — || April 7, 2003 || Kitt Peak || Spacewatch || — || align=right data-sort-value="0.88" | 880 m || 
|-id=960 bgcolor=#d6d6d6
| 421960 ||  || — || February 23, 2006 || Kitt Peak || Spacewatch || EOS || align=right | 2.5 km || 
|-id=961 bgcolor=#fefefe
| 421961 ||  || — || September 22, 2003 || Palomar || NEAT || V || align=right data-sort-value="0.88" | 880 m || 
|-id=962 bgcolor=#d6d6d6
| 421962 ||  || — || January 5, 2006 || Kitt Peak || Spacewatch || — || align=right | 2.4 km || 
|-id=963 bgcolor=#fefefe
| 421963 ||  || — || December 21, 2003 || Kitt Peak || Spacewatch || — || align=right data-sort-value="0.92" | 920 m || 
|-id=964 bgcolor=#d6d6d6
| 421964 ||  || — || July 28, 2009 || Catalina || CSS || — || align=right | 3.0 km || 
|-id=965 bgcolor=#fefefe
| 421965 ||  || — || September 28, 2001 || Palomar || NEAT || — || align=right data-sort-value="0.71" | 710 m || 
|-id=966 bgcolor=#d6d6d6
| 421966 ||  || — || April 26, 2007 || Mount Lemmon || Mount Lemmon Survey || — || align=right | 4.3 km || 
|-id=967 bgcolor=#E9E9E9
| 421967 ||  || — || March 28, 2009 || Mount Lemmon || Mount Lemmon Survey || — || align=right | 2.4 km || 
|-id=968 bgcolor=#d6d6d6
| 421968 ||  || — || June 13, 2007 || Kitt Peak || Spacewatch || — || align=right | 3.9 km || 
|-id=969 bgcolor=#fefefe
| 421969 ||  || — || September 28, 2003 || Kitt Peak || Spacewatch || — || align=right | 1.7 km || 
|-id=970 bgcolor=#d6d6d6
| 421970 ||  || — || April 25, 2007 || Mount Lemmon || Mount Lemmon Survey || — || align=right | 4.6 km || 
|-id=971 bgcolor=#E9E9E9
| 421971 ||  || — || November 18, 2006 || Mount Lemmon || Mount Lemmon Survey || — || align=right | 2.8 km || 
|-id=972 bgcolor=#E9E9E9
| 421972 ||  || — || July 21, 2001 || Kitt Peak || Spacewatch || — || align=right | 1.6 km || 
|-id=973 bgcolor=#fefefe
| 421973 ||  || — || October 19, 2007 || Catalina || CSS || — || align=right data-sort-value="0.90" | 900 m || 
|-id=974 bgcolor=#FA8072
| 421974 ||  || — || August 21, 2004 || Siding Spring || SSS || — || align=right data-sort-value="0.52" | 520 m || 
|-id=975 bgcolor=#E9E9E9
| 421975 ||  || — || July 29, 2001 || La Sagra || NEAT || EUN || align=right | 1.6 km || 
|-id=976 bgcolor=#E9E9E9
| 421976 ||  || — || April 1, 2005 || Kitt Peak || Spacewatch || — || align=right | 1.3 km || 
|-id=977 bgcolor=#fefefe
| 421977 ||  || — || February 28, 2006 || Mount Lemmon || Mount Lemmon Survey || — || align=right | 1.3 km || 
|-id=978 bgcolor=#fefefe
| 421978 ||  || — || April 9, 2010 || Kitt Peak || Spacewatch || — || align=right data-sort-value="0.94" | 940 m || 
|-id=979 bgcolor=#E9E9E9
| 421979 ||  || — || September 30, 2006 || Catalina || CSS || — || align=right data-sort-value="0.78" | 780 m || 
|-id=980 bgcolor=#d6d6d6
| 421980 ||  || — || August 20, 2004 || Kitt Peak || Spacewatch || — || align=right | 3.0 km || 
|-id=981 bgcolor=#E9E9E9
| 421981 ||  || — || March 5, 2008 || Mount Lemmon || Mount Lemmon Survey || — || align=right | 1.9 km || 
|-id=982 bgcolor=#E9E9E9
| 421982 ||  || — || February 14, 2013 || Kitt Peak || Spacewatch || — || align=right | 1.0 km || 
|-id=983 bgcolor=#d6d6d6
| 421983 ||  || — || April 14, 2008 || Mount Lemmon || Mount Lemmon Survey || — || align=right | 2.3 km || 
|-id=984 bgcolor=#d6d6d6
| 421984 ||  || — || September 19, 1998 || St Pardon de Conques || SDSS || — || align=right | 2.8 km || 
|-id=985 bgcolor=#E9E9E9
| 421985 ||  || — || November 1, 2010 || Kitt Peak || Spacewatch || — || align=right | 2.1 km || 
|-id=986 bgcolor=#fefefe
| 421986 ||  || — || November 5, 2007 || Kitt Peak || Spacewatch || — || align=right data-sort-value="0.87" | 870 m || 
|-id=987 bgcolor=#fefefe
| 421987 ||  || — || August 9, 2007 || Kitt Peak || Spacewatch || — || align=right data-sort-value="0.62" | 620 m || 
|-id=988 bgcolor=#d6d6d6
| 421988 ||  || — || September 18, 2003 || ESA OGS || Spacewatch || — || align=right | 2.8 km || 
|-id=989 bgcolor=#E9E9E9
| 421989 ||  || — || November 27, 2010 || Mount Lemmon || Mount Lemmon Survey || — || align=right | 1.9 km || 
|-id=990 bgcolor=#d6d6d6
| 421990 ||  || — || November 27, 2009 || Mount Lemmon || Mount Lemmon Survey || — || align=right | 4.2 km || 
|-id=991 bgcolor=#d6d6d6
| 421991 ||  || — || August 17, 2009 || Catalina || CSS || — || align=right | 4.1 km || 
|-id=992 bgcolor=#E9E9E9
| 421992 ||  || — || November 11, 2006 || Mount Lemmon || Mount Lemmon Survey || — || align=right | 1.4 km || 
|-id=993 bgcolor=#d6d6d6
| 421993 ||  || — || September 21, 2003 || Kitt Peak || Spacewatch || — || align=right | 3.1 km || 
|-id=994 bgcolor=#E9E9E9
| 421994 ||  || — || October 23, 2006 || Mount Lemmon || Mount Lemmon Survey || — || align=right | 1.7 km || 
|-id=995 bgcolor=#d6d6d6
| 421995 ||  || — || January 23, 2006 || Kitt Peak || Spacewatch || — || align=right | 5.6 km || 
|-id=996 bgcolor=#E9E9E9
| 421996 ||  || — || February 24, 2008 || Kitt Peak || Spacewatch || — || align=right | 1.8 km || 
|-id=997 bgcolor=#d6d6d6
| 421997 ||  || — || September 20, 2003 || Kitt Peak || Spacewatch || THB || align=right | 2.7 km || 
|-id=998 bgcolor=#E9E9E9
| 421998 ||  || — || September 16, 2010 || Catalina || CSS || — || align=right | 1.1 km || 
|-id=999 bgcolor=#E9E9E9
| 421999 ||  || — || March 7, 2008 || Mount Lemmon || Mount Lemmon Survey || AGN || align=right | 1.2 km || 
|-id=000 bgcolor=#E9E9E9
| 422000 ||  || — || December 21, 2003 || Kitt Peak || Spacewatch || — || align=right | 3.7 km || 
|}

References

External links 
 Discovery Circumstances: Numbered Minor Planets (420001)–(425000) (IAU Minor Planet Center)

0421